

605001–605100 

|-bgcolor=#E9E9E9
| 605001 ||  || — || September 19, 2014 || Haleakala || Pan-STARRS ||  || align=right | 1.2 km || 
|-id=002 bgcolor=#d6d6d6
| 605002 ||  || — || December 6, 2015 || Mount Lemmon || Mount Lemmon Survey ||  || align=right | 2.9 km || 
|-id=003 bgcolor=#d6d6d6
| 605003 ||  || — || September 18, 2014 || Haleakala || Pan-STARRS ||  || align=right | 2.2 km || 
|-id=004 bgcolor=#d6d6d6
| 605004 ||  || — || October 18, 2009 || Mount Lemmon || Mount Lemmon Survey ||  || align=right | 2.5 km || 
|-id=005 bgcolor=#d6d6d6
| 605005 ||  || — || March 27, 2012 || Mount Lemmon || Mount Lemmon Survey ||  || align=right | 2.2 km || 
|-id=006 bgcolor=#fefefe
| 605006 ||  || — || June 17, 2014 || Mount Lemmon || Mount Lemmon Survey ||  || align=right data-sort-value="0.46" | 460 m || 
|-id=007 bgcolor=#d6d6d6
| 605007 ||  || — || December 8, 2015 || Haleakala || Pan-STARRS ||  || align=right | 1.8 km || 
|-id=008 bgcolor=#d6d6d6
| 605008 ||  || — || December 5, 2015 || Haleakala || Pan-STARRS ||  || align=right | 2.6 km || 
|-id=009 bgcolor=#d6d6d6
| 605009 ||  || — || August 23, 2014 || Haleakala || Pan-STARRS ||  || align=right | 2.1 km || 
|-id=010 bgcolor=#d6d6d6
| 605010 ||  || — || December 13, 2015 || Haleakala || Pan-STARRS ||  || align=right | 1.8 km || 
|-id=011 bgcolor=#fefefe
| 605011 ||  || — || August 4, 2001 || Palomar || NEAT || H || align=right data-sort-value="0.82" | 820 m || 
|-id=012 bgcolor=#fefefe
| 605012 ||  || — || December 17, 2015 || Haleakala || Pan-STARRS || H || align=right data-sort-value="0.65" | 650 m || 
|-id=013 bgcolor=#fefefe
| 605013 ||  || — || April 10, 2010 || Kitt Peak || Spacewatch ||  || align=right data-sort-value="0.60" | 600 m || 
|-id=014 bgcolor=#fefefe
| 605014 ||  || — || December 16, 2015 || Haleakala || Pan-STARRS || H || align=right data-sort-value="0.66" | 660 m || 
|-id=015 bgcolor=#fefefe
| 605015 ||  || — || November 30, 2015 || Catalina || CSS ||  || align=right data-sort-value="0.73" | 730 m || 
|-id=016 bgcolor=#d6d6d6
| 605016 ||  || — || January 2, 2016 || Mount Lemmon || R. A. Kowalski ||  || align=right | 2.5 km || 
|-id=017 bgcolor=#d6d6d6
| 605017 ||  || — || February 11, 2011 || Mount Lemmon || Mount Lemmon Survey ||  || align=right | 2.2 km || 
|-id=018 bgcolor=#fefefe
| 605018 ||  || — || March 15, 2013 || Mount Lemmon || Mount Lemmon Survey ||  || align=right data-sort-value="0.64" | 640 m || 
|-id=019 bgcolor=#fefefe
| 605019 ||  || — || April 10, 2013 || Haleakala || Pan-STARRS ||  || align=right data-sort-value="0.51" | 510 m || 
|-id=020 bgcolor=#fefefe
| 605020 ||  || — || December 4, 2005 || Kitt Peak || Spacewatch ||  || align=right data-sort-value="0.52" | 520 m || 
|-id=021 bgcolor=#fefefe
| 605021 ||  || — || October 21, 2008 || Kitt Peak || Spacewatch ||  || align=right data-sort-value="0.74" | 740 m || 
|-id=022 bgcolor=#fefefe
| 605022 ||  || — || September 21, 2011 || Haleakala || Pan-STARRS ||  || align=right data-sort-value="0.43" | 430 m || 
|-id=023 bgcolor=#fefefe
| 605023 ||  || — || February 15, 2013 || Haleakala || Pan-STARRS ||  || align=right data-sort-value="0.40" | 400 m || 
|-id=024 bgcolor=#fefefe
| 605024 ||  || — || August 3, 2014 || Haleakala || Pan-STARRS ||  || align=right data-sort-value="0.52" | 520 m || 
|-id=025 bgcolor=#fefefe
| 605025 ||  || — || January 7, 2009 || Kitt Peak || Spacewatch ||  || align=right data-sort-value="0.63" | 630 m || 
|-id=026 bgcolor=#d6d6d6
| 605026 ||  || — || December 8, 2010 || Mount Lemmon || Mount Lemmon Survey ||  || align=right | 2.9 km || 
|-id=027 bgcolor=#d6d6d6
| 605027 ||  || — || January 4, 2016 || Haleakala || Pan-STARRS ||  || align=right | 2.8 km || 
|-id=028 bgcolor=#E9E9E9
| 605028 ||  || — || June 29, 2014 || Mount Lemmon || Mount Lemmon Survey ||  || align=right | 2.0 km || 
|-id=029 bgcolor=#d6d6d6
| 605029 ||  || — || August 18, 2014 || Haleakala || Pan-STARRS ||  || align=right | 2.2 km || 
|-id=030 bgcolor=#E9E9E9
| 605030 ||  || — || April 21, 2013 || Haleakala || Pan-STARRS ||  || align=right | 1.0 km || 
|-id=031 bgcolor=#d6d6d6
| 605031 ||  || — || August 6, 2007 || Lulin || LUSS ||  || align=right | 4.6 km || 
|-id=032 bgcolor=#d6d6d6
| 605032 ||  || — || January 9, 2016 || Haleakala || Pan-STARRS || Tj (2.97) || align=right | 2.5 km || 
|-id=033 bgcolor=#d6d6d6
| 605033 ||  || — || December 13, 2015 || Haleakala || Pan-STARRS ||  || align=right | 2.4 km || 
|-id=034 bgcolor=#E9E9E9
| 605034 ||  || — || April 21, 2013 || Haleakala || Pan-STARRS ||  || align=right | 1.1 km || 
|-id=035 bgcolor=#fefefe
| 605035 ||  || — || March 27, 2009 || Catalina || CSS ||  || align=right data-sort-value="0.76" | 760 m || 
|-id=036 bgcolor=#d6d6d6
| 605036 ||  || — || December 8, 2015 || Haleakala || Pan-STARRS ||  || align=right | 2.2 km || 
|-id=037 bgcolor=#FA8072
| 605037 ||  || — || December 14, 2014 || Haleakala || Pan-STARRS ||  || align=right | 2.9 km || 
|-id=038 bgcolor=#fefefe
| 605038 ||  || — || November 26, 2011 || Kitt Peak || Spacewatch ||  || align=right data-sort-value="0.74" | 740 m || 
|-id=039 bgcolor=#fefefe
| 605039 ||  || — || September 10, 2001 || Socorro || LINEAR || H || align=right data-sort-value="0.71" | 710 m || 
|-id=040 bgcolor=#E9E9E9
| 605040 ||  || — || November 13, 2010 || Kitt Peak || Spacewatch ||  || align=right | 1.1 km || 
|-id=041 bgcolor=#fefefe
| 605041 ||  || — || December 9, 2015 || Haleakala || Pan-STARRS || H || align=right data-sort-value="0.49" | 490 m || 
|-id=042 bgcolor=#E9E9E9
| 605042 ||  || — || November 24, 2006 || Mount Lemmon || Mount Lemmon Survey ||  || align=right data-sort-value="0.77" | 770 m || 
|-id=043 bgcolor=#d6d6d6
| 605043 ||  || — || January 11, 2016 || Haleakala || Pan-STARRS ||  || align=right | 2.6 km || 
|-id=044 bgcolor=#fefefe
| 605044 ||  || — || December 8, 2015 || Haleakala || Pan-STARRS || H || align=right data-sort-value="0.51" | 510 m || 
|-id=045 bgcolor=#d6d6d6
| 605045 ||  || — || May 12, 2013 || Mount Lemmon || Mount Lemmon Survey ||  || align=right | 3.1 km || 
|-id=046 bgcolor=#fefefe
| 605046 ||  || — || January 3, 2016 || Mount Lemmon || Mount Lemmon Survey || H || align=right data-sort-value="0.37" | 370 m || 
|-id=047 bgcolor=#d6d6d6
| 605047 ||  || — || February 28, 2009 || Kitt Peak || Spacewatch || 3:2 || align=right | 3.7 km || 
|-id=048 bgcolor=#fefefe
| 605048 ||  || — || January 8, 2016 || Haleakala || Pan-STARRS || H || align=right data-sort-value="0.47" | 470 m || 
|-id=049 bgcolor=#fefefe
| 605049 ||  || — || January 14, 2016 || Haleakala || Pan-STARRS ||  || align=right data-sort-value="0.53" | 530 m || 
|-id=050 bgcolor=#fefefe
| 605050 ||  || — || May 15, 2013 || Haleakala || Pan-STARRS ||  || align=right data-sort-value="0.64" | 640 m || 
|-id=051 bgcolor=#fefefe
| 605051 ||  || — || January 20, 2009 || Mount Lemmon || Mount Lemmon Survey ||  || align=right data-sort-value="0.55" | 550 m || 
|-id=052 bgcolor=#fefefe
| 605052 ||  || — || January 8, 2016 || Haleakala || Pan-STARRS ||  || align=right data-sort-value="0.76" | 760 m || 
|-id=053 bgcolor=#fefefe
| 605053 ||  || — || January 15, 2016 || Haleakala || Pan-STARRS ||  || align=right data-sort-value="0.62" | 620 m || 
|-id=054 bgcolor=#fefefe
| 605054 ||  || — || January 11, 2016 || Haleakala || Pan-STARRS ||  || align=right data-sort-value="0.63" | 630 m || 
|-id=055 bgcolor=#fefefe
| 605055 ||  || — || January 15, 2016 || Haleakala || Pan-STARRS ||  || align=right data-sort-value="0.64" | 640 m || 
|-id=056 bgcolor=#C2FFFF
| 605056 ||  || — || January 4, 2016 || Haleakala || Pan-STARRS || L5 || align=right | 7.5 km || 
|-id=057 bgcolor=#E9E9E9
| 605057 ||  || — || January 8, 2016 || Haleakala || Pan-STARRS ||  || align=right | 1.7 km || 
|-id=058 bgcolor=#C2FFFF
| 605058 ||  || — || January 13, 2016 || Mount Lemmon || Mount Lemmon Survey || L5 || align=right | 6.8 km || 
|-id=059 bgcolor=#d6d6d6
| 605059 ||  || — || January 7, 2016 || Haleakala || Pan-STARRS ||  || align=right | 2.7 km || 
|-id=060 bgcolor=#E9E9E9
| 605060 ||  || — || January 4, 2016 || Haleakala || Pan-STARRS ||  || align=right | 1.5 km || 
|-id=061 bgcolor=#fefefe
| 605061 ||  || — || January 2, 2016 || Mount Lemmon || Mount Lemmon Survey ||  || align=right data-sort-value="0.65" | 650 m || 
|-id=062 bgcolor=#E9E9E9
| 605062 ||  || — || January 2, 2016 || Mount Lemmon || R. A. Kowalski ||  || align=right | 1.1 km || 
|-id=063 bgcolor=#C2FFFF
| 605063 ||  || — || January 2, 2016 || Mount Lemmon || Mount Lemmon Survey || L5 || align=right | 7.0 km || 
|-id=064 bgcolor=#fefefe
| 605064 ||  || — || December 5, 2015 || Haleakala || Pan-STARRS || H || align=right data-sort-value="0.59" | 590 m || 
|-id=065 bgcolor=#fefefe
| 605065 ||  || — || December 28, 2000 || Kitt Peak || Spacewatch ||  || align=right data-sort-value="0.87" | 870 m || 
|-id=066 bgcolor=#fefefe
| 605066 ||  || — || January 20, 2009 || Kitt Peak || Spacewatch ||  || align=right data-sort-value="0.50" | 500 m || 
|-id=067 bgcolor=#fefefe
| 605067 ||  || — || December 3, 2005 || Mauna Kea || Mauna Kea Obs. ||  || align=right data-sort-value="0.63" | 630 m || 
|-id=068 bgcolor=#d6d6d6
| 605068 ||  || — || January 8, 2016 || Haleakala || Pan-STARRS ||  || align=right | 3.4 km || 
|-id=069 bgcolor=#E9E9E9
| 605069 ||  || — || October 1, 2014 || Haleakala || Pan-STARRS ||  || align=right data-sort-value="0.96" | 960 m || 
|-id=070 bgcolor=#FFC2E0
| 605070 ||  || — || January 30, 2016 || Haleakala || Pan-STARRS || APOPHA || align=right data-sort-value="0.41" | 410 m || 
|-id=071 bgcolor=#fefefe
| 605071 ||  || — || August 10, 2010 || Kitt Peak || Spacewatch ||  || align=right data-sort-value="0.67" | 670 m || 
|-id=072 bgcolor=#d6d6d6
| 605072 ||  || — || February 14, 2005 || Kitt Peak || Spacewatch ||  || align=right | 3.5 km || 
|-id=073 bgcolor=#fefefe
| 605073 ||  || — || January 30, 2016 || Mount Lemmon || Mount Lemmon Survey ||  || align=right data-sort-value="0.54" | 540 m || 
|-id=074 bgcolor=#d6d6d6
| 605074 ||  || — || January 15, 2016 || Haleakala || Pan-STARRS || 3:2 || align=right | 3.7 km || 
|-id=075 bgcolor=#fefefe
| 605075 ||  || — || November 1, 2005 || Mount Lemmon || Mount Lemmon Survey ||  || align=right data-sort-value="0.65" | 650 m || 
|-id=076 bgcolor=#fefefe
| 605076 ||  || — || July 25, 2014 || Haleakala || Pan-STARRS ||  || align=right data-sort-value="0.73" | 730 m || 
|-id=077 bgcolor=#fefefe
| 605077 ||  || — || January 2, 2016 || Mount Lemmon || Mount Lemmon Survey ||  || align=right data-sort-value="0.58" | 580 m || 
|-id=078 bgcolor=#fefefe
| 605078 ||  || — || April 1, 2003 || Apache Point || SDSS Collaboration ||  || align=right data-sort-value="0.48" | 480 m || 
|-id=079 bgcolor=#E9E9E9
| 605079 ||  || — || March 25, 2012 || Mount Lemmon || Mount Lemmon Survey ||  || align=right | 1.5 km || 
|-id=080 bgcolor=#fefefe
| 605080 ||  || — || January 17, 2016 || Haleakala || Pan-STARRS ||  || align=right data-sort-value="0.58" | 580 m || 
|-id=081 bgcolor=#fefefe
| 605081 ||  || — || January 18, 2016 || Haleakala || Pan-STARRS ||  || align=right data-sort-value="0.58" | 580 m || 
|-id=082 bgcolor=#E9E9E9
| 605082 ||  || — || April 28, 2012 || Mount Lemmon || Mount Lemmon Survey ||  || align=right | 1.4 km || 
|-id=083 bgcolor=#fefefe
| 605083 ||  || — || December 30, 2008 || Mount Lemmon || Mount Lemmon Survey ||  || align=right data-sort-value="0.52" | 520 m || 
|-id=084 bgcolor=#d6d6d6
| 605084 ||  || — || October 16, 2007 || Mount Lemmon || Mount Lemmon Survey ||  || align=right | 2.9 km || 
|-id=085 bgcolor=#fefefe
| 605085 ||  || — || December 9, 2015 || Haleakala || Pan-STARRS ||  || align=right data-sort-value="0.73" | 730 m || 
|-id=086 bgcolor=#fefefe
| 605086 ||  || — || January 29, 2016 || Kitt Peak || Spacewatch ||  || align=right data-sort-value="0.54" | 540 m || 
|-id=087 bgcolor=#fefefe
| 605087 ||  || — || January 29, 2011 || Kitt Peak || Spacewatch || H || align=right data-sort-value="0.64" | 640 m || 
|-id=088 bgcolor=#fefefe
| 605088 ||  || — || January 20, 2009 || Kitt Peak || Spacewatch ||  || align=right data-sort-value="0.48" | 480 m || 
|-id=089 bgcolor=#fefefe
| 605089 ||  || — || February 19, 2009 || Kitt Peak || Spacewatch ||  || align=right data-sort-value="0.67" | 670 m || 
|-id=090 bgcolor=#fefefe
| 605090 ||  || — || March 19, 2009 || Mount Lemmon || Mount Lemmon Survey ||  || align=right data-sort-value="0.60" | 600 m || 
|-id=091 bgcolor=#d6d6d6
| 605091 ||  || — || November 21, 2014 || Haleakala || Pan-STARRS ||  || align=right | 2.4 km || 
|-id=092 bgcolor=#fefefe
| 605092 ||  || — || January 9, 2002 || Kitt Peak || Spacewatch ||  || align=right data-sort-value="0.57" | 570 m || 
|-id=093 bgcolor=#fefefe
| 605093 ||  || — || October 24, 2011 || Haleakala || Pan-STARRS ||  || align=right data-sort-value="0.53" | 530 m || 
|-id=094 bgcolor=#fefefe
| 605094 ||  || — || May 3, 2009 || La Sagra || OAM Obs. ||  || align=right data-sort-value="0.70" | 700 m || 
|-id=095 bgcolor=#fefefe
| 605095 ||  || — || March 5, 2002 || Kitt Peak || Spacewatch ||  || align=right data-sort-value="0.55" | 550 m || 
|-id=096 bgcolor=#fefefe
| 605096 ||  || — || October 19, 2007 || Catalina || CSS ||  || align=right data-sort-value="0.69" | 690 m || 
|-id=097 bgcolor=#fefefe
| 605097 ||  || — || February 3, 2016 || Haleakala || Pan-STARRS ||  || align=right data-sort-value="0.65" | 650 m || 
|-id=098 bgcolor=#E9E9E9
| 605098 ||  || — || March 30, 2012 || Catalina || CSS ||  || align=right | 1.5 km || 
|-id=099 bgcolor=#fefefe
| 605099 ||  || — || December 22, 2008 || Mount Lemmon || Mount Lemmon Survey ||  || align=right data-sort-value="0.84" | 840 m || 
|-id=100 bgcolor=#fefefe
| 605100 ||  || — || February 4, 2016 || Haleakala || Pan-STARRS ||  || align=right data-sort-value="0.71" | 710 m || 
|}

605101–605200 

|-bgcolor=#fefefe
| 605101 ||  || — || December 16, 2007 || Kitt Peak || Spacewatch ||  || align=right data-sort-value="0.78" | 780 m || 
|-id=102 bgcolor=#fefefe
| 605102 ||  || — || August 20, 2014 || Haleakala || Pan-STARRS ||  || align=right data-sort-value="0.62" | 620 m || 
|-id=103 bgcolor=#fefefe
| 605103 ||  || — || October 12, 2007 || Kitt Peak || Spacewatch ||  || align=right data-sort-value="0.58" | 580 m || 
|-id=104 bgcolor=#fefefe
| 605104 ||  || — || February 5, 2016 || Haleakala || Pan-STARRS ||  || align=right data-sort-value="0.56" | 560 m || 
|-id=105 bgcolor=#fefefe
| 605105 ||  || — || April 12, 2013 || Haleakala || Pan-STARRS ||  || align=right data-sort-value="0.59" | 590 m || 
|-id=106 bgcolor=#d6d6d6
| 605106 ||  || — || October 9, 2008 || Kitt Peak || Spacewatch ||  || align=right | 1.8 km || 
|-id=107 bgcolor=#E9E9E9
| 605107 ||  || — || July 12, 2013 || Haleakala || Pan-STARRS ||  || align=right | 1.7 km || 
|-id=108 bgcolor=#fefefe
| 605108 ||  || — || October 20, 2011 || Kitt Peak || Spacewatch ||  || align=right data-sort-value="0.55" | 550 m || 
|-id=109 bgcolor=#fefefe
| 605109 ||  || — || September 23, 2008 || Kitt Peak || Spacewatch ||  || align=right data-sort-value="0.52" | 520 m || 
|-id=110 bgcolor=#fefefe
| 605110 ||  || — || November 27, 2011 || Kitt Peak || Spacewatch ||  || align=right data-sort-value="0.53" | 530 m || 
|-id=111 bgcolor=#fefefe
| 605111 ||  || — || February 5, 2016 || Haleakala || Pan-STARRS ||  || align=right data-sort-value="0.68" | 680 m || 
|-id=112 bgcolor=#fefefe
| 605112 ||  || — || April 19, 2009 || Mount Lemmon || Mount Lemmon Survey ||  || align=right data-sort-value="0.58" | 580 m || 
|-id=113 bgcolor=#fefefe
| 605113 ||  || — || April 4, 2013 || Siding Spring || SSS ||  || align=right data-sort-value="0.64" | 640 m || 
|-id=114 bgcolor=#fefefe
| 605114 ||  || — || September 26, 2011 || Haleakala || Pan-STARRS ||  || align=right data-sort-value="0.49" | 490 m || 
|-id=115 bgcolor=#fefefe
| 605115 ||  || — || March 2, 2006 || Kitt Peak || Spacewatch ||  || align=right data-sort-value="0.50" | 500 m || 
|-id=116 bgcolor=#d6d6d6
| 605116 ||  || — || February 4, 2006 || Kitt Peak || Spacewatch || KOR || align=right | 1.4 km || 
|-id=117 bgcolor=#E9E9E9
| 605117 ||  || — || February 23, 2012 || Mount Lemmon || Mount Lemmon Survey ||  || align=right data-sort-value="0.79" | 790 m || 
|-id=118 bgcolor=#d6d6d6
| 605118 ||  || — || September 24, 2009 || Mount Lemmon || Mount Lemmon Survey ||  || align=right | 2.6 km || 
|-id=119 bgcolor=#d6d6d6
| 605119 ||  || — || August 13, 2004 || Cerro Tololo || Cerro Tololo Obs. || 3:2 || align=right | 3.5 km || 
|-id=120 bgcolor=#fefefe
| 605120 ||  || — || January 6, 2006 || Mount Lemmon || Mount Lemmon Survey ||  || align=right data-sort-value="0.71" | 710 m || 
|-id=121 bgcolor=#fefefe
| 605121 ||  || — || February 9, 2016 || Haleakala || Pan-STARRS ||  || align=right data-sort-value="0.54" | 540 m || 
|-id=122 bgcolor=#fefefe
| 605122 ||  || — || October 11, 2012 || Haleakala || Pan-STARRS || H || align=right data-sort-value="0.49" | 490 m || 
|-id=123 bgcolor=#fefefe
| 605123 ||  || — || May 15, 2013 || Haleakala || Pan-STARRS ||  || align=right data-sort-value="0.51" | 510 m || 
|-id=124 bgcolor=#fefefe
| 605124 ||  || — || February 4, 2006 || Kitt Peak || Spacewatch ||  || align=right data-sort-value="0.66" | 660 m || 
|-id=125 bgcolor=#E9E9E9
| 605125 ||  || — || April 27, 2012 || Haleakala || Pan-STARRS ||  || align=right | 1.6 km || 
|-id=126 bgcolor=#fefefe
| 605126 ||  || — || February 28, 2009 || Kitt Peak || Spacewatch || NYS || align=right data-sort-value="0.58" | 580 m || 
|-id=127 bgcolor=#fefefe
| 605127 ||  || — || February 20, 2009 || Kitt Peak || Spacewatch ||  || align=right data-sort-value="0.59" | 590 m || 
|-id=128 bgcolor=#fefefe
| 605128 ||  || — || January 17, 2016 || Haleakala || Pan-STARRS ||  || align=right data-sort-value="0.63" | 630 m || 
|-id=129 bgcolor=#fefefe
| 605129 ||  || — || November 17, 2011 || Kitt Peak || Spacewatch ||  || align=right data-sort-value="0.51" | 510 m || 
|-id=130 bgcolor=#E9E9E9
| 605130 ||  || — || March 11, 2008 || Catalina || CSS ||  || align=right | 1.3 km || 
|-id=131 bgcolor=#fefefe
| 605131 ||  || — || February 12, 2016 || Haleakala || Pan-STARRS || H || align=right data-sort-value="0.57" | 570 m || 
|-id=132 bgcolor=#fefefe
| 605132 ||  || — || September 15, 2007 || Mount Lemmon || Mount Lemmon Survey ||  || align=right data-sort-value="0.57" | 570 m || 
|-id=133 bgcolor=#E9E9E9
| 605133 ||  || — || August 10, 2005 || Siding Spring || SSS ||  || align=right | 2.4 km || 
|-id=134 bgcolor=#fefefe
| 605134 ||  || — || April 17, 2009 || Mount Lemmon || Mount Lemmon Survey ||  || align=right data-sort-value="0.67" | 670 m || 
|-id=135 bgcolor=#fefefe
| 605135 ||  || — || May 20, 2005 || Mount Lemmon || Mount Lemmon Survey ||  || align=right data-sort-value="0.95" | 950 m || 
|-id=136 bgcolor=#fefefe
| 605136 ||  || — || July 15, 2013 || Haleakala || Pan-STARRS ||  || align=right data-sort-value="0.73" | 730 m || 
|-id=137 bgcolor=#E9E9E9
| 605137 ||  || — || April 20, 2012 || Siding Spring || SSS ||  || align=right | 1.8 km || 
|-id=138 bgcolor=#fefefe
| 605138 ||  || — || March 11, 2005 || Mount Lemmon || Mount Lemmon Survey ||  || align=right data-sort-value="0.55" | 550 m || 
|-id=139 bgcolor=#fefefe
| 605139 ||  || — || May 8, 2013 || Haleakala || Pan-STARRS ||  || align=right data-sort-value="0.58" | 580 m || 
|-id=140 bgcolor=#fefefe
| 605140 ||  || — || February 22, 2009 || Kitt Peak || Spacewatch ||  || align=right data-sort-value="0.56" | 560 m || 
|-id=141 bgcolor=#fefefe
| 605141 ||  || — || December 5, 2007 || Mount Lemmon || Mount Lemmon Survey ||  || align=right data-sort-value="0.70" | 700 m || 
|-id=142 bgcolor=#fefefe
| 605142 ||  || — || February 10, 2016 || Haleakala || Pan-STARRS ||  || align=right data-sort-value="0.72" | 720 m || 
|-id=143 bgcolor=#d6d6d6
| 605143 ||  || — || June 18, 2013 || Mount Lemmon || Mount Lemmon Survey ||  || align=right | 2.7 km || 
|-id=144 bgcolor=#fefefe
| 605144 ||  || — || February 11, 2016 || Haleakala || Pan-STARRS ||  || align=right data-sort-value="0.75" | 750 m || 
|-id=145 bgcolor=#fefefe
| 605145 ||  || — || August 10, 2010 || Kitt Peak || Spacewatch ||  || align=right data-sort-value="0.63" | 630 m || 
|-id=146 bgcolor=#fefefe
| 605146 ||  || — || August 25, 2003 || Cerro Tololo || Cerro Tololo Obs. ||  || align=right data-sort-value="0.64" | 640 m || 
|-id=147 bgcolor=#fefefe
| 605147 ||  || — || March 19, 2009 || Mount Lemmon || Mount Lemmon Survey ||  || align=right data-sort-value="0.73" | 730 m || 
|-id=148 bgcolor=#fefefe
| 605148 ||  || — || February 5, 2016 || Haleakala || Pan-STARRS ||  || align=right data-sort-value="0.75" | 750 m || 
|-id=149 bgcolor=#fefefe
| 605149 ||  || — || February 24, 2012 || Mount Lemmon || Mount Lemmon Survey ||  || align=right data-sort-value="0.72" | 720 m || 
|-id=150 bgcolor=#fefefe
| 605150 ||  || — || February 9, 2016 || Haleakala || Pan-STARRS ||  || align=right data-sort-value="0.67" | 670 m || 
|-id=151 bgcolor=#FA8072
| 605151 ||  || — || February 14, 2016 || Haleakala || Pan-STARRS ||  || align=right data-sort-value="0.31" | 310 m || 
|-id=152 bgcolor=#fefefe
| 605152 ||  || — || February 11, 2016 || Haleakala || Pan-STARRS ||  || align=right data-sort-value="0.51" | 510 m || 
|-id=153 bgcolor=#fefefe
| 605153 ||  || — || February 3, 2016 || Haleakala || Pan-STARRS ||  || align=right data-sort-value="0.74" | 740 m || 
|-id=154 bgcolor=#E9E9E9
| 605154 ||  || — || February 9, 2016 || Haleakala || Pan-STARRS ||  || align=right data-sort-value="0.87" | 870 m || 
|-id=155 bgcolor=#d6d6d6
| 605155 ||  || — || October 11, 2002 || Apache Point || SDSS Collaboration ||  || align=right | 2.0 km || 
|-id=156 bgcolor=#fefefe
| 605156 ||  || — || February 5, 2016 || Haleakala || Pan-STARRS ||  || align=right data-sort-value="0.56" | 560 m || 
|-id=157 bgcolor=#fefefe
| 605157 ||  || — || February 5, 2016 || Haleakala || Pan-STARRS ||  || align=right data-sort-value="0.48" | 480 m || 
|-id=158 bgcolor=#fefefe
| 605158 ||  || — || March 22, 2009 || Mount Lemmon || Mount Lemmon Survey ||  || align=right data-sort-value="0.62" | 620 m || 
|-id=159 bgcolor=#fefefe
| 605159 ||  || — || February 4, 2016 || Haleakala || Pan-STARRS ||  || align=right data-sort-value="0.52" | 520 m || 
|-id=160 bgcolor=#fefefe
| 605160 ||  || — || February 5, 2016 || Haleakala || Pan-STARRS ||  || align=right data-sort-value="0.64" | 640 m || 
|-id=161 bgcolor=#d6d6d6
| 605161 ||  || — || February 9, 2016 || Haleakala || Pan-STARRS ||  || align=right | 2.2 km || 
|-id=162 bgcolor=#E9E9E9
| 605162 ||  || — || February 11, 2016 || Haleakala || Pan-STARRS ||  || align=right | 1.1 km || 
|-id=163 bgcolor=#d6d6d6
| 605163 ||  || — || November 20, 2014 || Mount Lemmon || Mount Lemmon Survey ||  || align=right | 2.1 km || 
|-id=164 bgcolor=#E9E9E9
| 605164 ||  || — || April 12, 2012 || Haleakala || Pan-STARRS ||  || align=right | 1.7 km || 
|-id=165 bgcolor=#d6d6d6
| 605165 ||  || — || February 5, 2016 || Haleakala || Pan-STARRS ||  || align=right | 1.9 km || 
|-id=166 bgcolor=#fefefe
| 605166 ||  || — || February 3, 2009 || Kitt Peak || Spacewatch ||  || align=right data-sort-value="0.55" | 550 m || 
|-id=167 bgcolor=#fefefe
| 605167 ||  || — || November 1, 2008 || Mount Lemmon || Mount Lemmon Survey ||  || align=right data-sort-value="0.64" | 640 m || 
|-id=168 bgcolor=#E9E9E9
| 605168 ||  || — || September 17, 2010 || Mount Lemmon || Mount Lemmon Survey ||  || align=right data-sort-value="0.93" | 930 m || 
|-id=169 bgcolor=#d6d6d6
| 605169 ||  || — || September 16, 2003 || Kitt Peak || Spacewatch ||  || align=right | 2.1 km || 
|-id=170 bgcolor=#E9E9E9
| 605170 ||  || — || August 16, 2009 || Kitt Peak || Spacewatch ||  || align=right | 1.4 km || 
|-id=171 bgcolor=#fefefe
| 605171 ||  || — || January 27, 2012 || Mount Lemmon || Mount Lemmon Survey ||  || align=right data-sort-value="0.68" | 680 m || 
|-id=172 bgcolor=#fefefe
| 605172 ||  || — || February 5, 2016 || Haleakala || Pan-STARRS ||  || align=right data-sort-value="0.58" | 580 m || 
|-id=173 bgcolor=#E9E9E9
| 605173 ||  || — || August 15, 2013 || Haleakala || Pan-STARRS ||  || align=right | 1.2 km || 
|-id=174 bgcolor=#fefefe
| 605174 ||  || — || February 27, 2016 || Mount Lemmon || Mount Lemmon Survey ||  || align=right data-sort-value="0.57" | 570 m || 
|-id=175 bgcolor=#E9E9E9
| 605175 ||  || — || March 28, 2008 || Mount Lemmon || Mount Lemmon Survey ||  || align=right data-sort-value="0.69" | 690 m || 
|-id=176 bgcolor=#fefefe
| 605176 ||  || — || February 24, 2009 || Kitt Peak || Spacewatch ||  || align=right data-sort-value="0.61" | 610 m || 
|-id=177 bgcolor=#fefefe
| 605177 ||  || — || October 10, 2007 || Mount Lemmon || Mount Lemmon Survey ||  || align=right data-sort-value="0.83" | 830 m || 
|-id=178 bgcolor=#fefefe
| 605178 ||  || — || February 20, 2009 || Kitt Peak || Spacewatch ||  || align=right data-sort-value="0.55" | 550 m || 
|-id=179 bgcolor=#fefefe
| 605179 ||  || — || September 14, 2007 || Kitt Peak || Spacewatch ||  || align=right data-sort-value="0.75" | 750 m || 
|-id=180 bgcolor=#fefefe
| 605180 ||  || — || September 19, 1998 || Apache Point || SDSS Collaboration || H || align=right data-sort-value="0.76" | 760 m || 
|-id=181 bgcolor=#fefefe
| 605181 ||  || — || February 8, 2016 || Mount Lemmon || Mount Lemmon Survey ||  || align=right data-sort-value="0.51" | 510 m || 
|-id=182 bgcolor=#fefefe
| 605182 ||  || — || February 19, 2016 || Haleakala || Pan-STARRS ||  || align=right data-sort-value="0.59" | 590 m || 
|-id=183 bgcolor=#fefefe
| 605183 ||  || — || May 3, 2006 || Mount Lemmon || Mount Lemmon Survey ||  || align=right data-sort-value="0.56" | 560 m || 
|-id=184 bgcolor=#E9E9E9
| 605184 ||  || — || March 31, 2008 || Mount Lemmon || Mount Lemmon Survey ||  || align=right | 1.5 km || 
|-id=185 bgcolor=#fefefe
| 605185 ||  || — || October 9, 2004 || Kitt Peak || Spacewatch ||  || align=right data-sort-value="0.95" | 950 m || 
|-id=186 bgcolor=#d6d6d6
| 605186 ||  || — || June 11, 2007 || Mauna Kea || Mauna Kea Obs. ||  || align=right | 2.5 km || 
|-id=187 bgcolor=#d6d6d6
| 605187 ||  || — || March 3, 2016 || Haleakala || Pan-STARRS ||  || align=right | 3.0 km || 
|-id=188 bgcolor=#fefefe
| 605188 ||  || — || September 24, 2006 || Kitt Peak || Spacewatch || H || align=right data-sort-value="0.52" | 520 m || 
|-id=189 bgcolor=#fefefe
| 605189 ||  || — || April 2, 2006 || Kitt Peak || Spacewatch ||  || align=right data-sort-value="0.46" | 460 m || 
|-id=190 bgcolor=#E9E9E9
| 605190 ||  || — || April 21, 2012 || Haleakala || Pan-STARRS ||  || align=right | 1.5 km || 
|-id=191 bgcolor=#fefefe
| 605191 ||  || — || November 19, 2008 || Mount Lemmon || Mount Lemmon Survey ||  || align=right data-sort-value="0.54" | 540 m || 
|-id=192 bgcolor=#fefefe
| 605192 ||  || — || December 10, 2012 || Haleakala || Pan-STARRS || H || align=right data-sort-value="0.57" | 570 m || 
|-id=193 bgcolor=#fefefe
| 605193 ||  || — || June 16, 2010 || Mount Lemmon || Mount Lemmon Survey ||  || align=right data-sort-value="0.64" | 640 m || 
|-id=194 bgcolor=#fefefe
| 605194 ||  || — || October 13, 2007 || Kitt Peak || Spacewatch ||  || align=right data-sort-value="0.73" | 730 m || 
|-id=195 bgcolor=#fefefe
| 605195 ||  || — || January 19, 2012 || Haleakala || Pan-STARRS ||  || align=right data-sort-value="0.62" | 620 m || 
|-id=196 bgcolor=#fefefe
| 605196 ||  || — || February 4, 2002 || Anderson Mesa || LONEOS || H || align=right data-sort-value="0.75" | 750 m || 
|-id=197 bgcolor=#E9E9E9
| 605197 ||  || — || October 23, 2014 || Mount Lemmon || Mount Lemmon Survey ||  || align=right | 1.2 km || 
|-id=198 bgcolor=#fefefe
| 605198 ||  || — || April 15, 2013 || Haleakala || Pan-STARRS ||  || align=right data-sort-value="0.66" | 660 m || 
|-id=199 bgcolor=#fefefe
| 605199 ||  || — || September 18, 2014 || Haleakala || Pan-STARRS ||  || align=right data-sort-value="0.72" | 720 m || 
|-id=200 bgcolor=#fefefe
| 605200 ||  || — || January 27, 2012 || Mount Lemmon || Mount Lemmon Survey ||  || align=right data-sort-value="0.51" | 510 m || 
|}

605201–605300 

|-bgcolor=#fefefe
| 605201 ||  || — || August 4, 2013 || Haleakala || Pan-STARRS ||  || align=right data-sort-value="0.54" | 540 m || 
|-id=202 bgcolor=#fefefe
| 605202 ||  || — || March 1, 2016 || Mount Lemmon || Mount Lemmon Survey ||  || align=right data-sort-value="0.49" | 490 m || 
|-id=203 bgcolor=#fefefe
| 605203 ||  || — || March 9, 2005 || Kitt Peak || Spacewatch ||  || align=right | 1.3 km || 
|-id=204 bgcolor=#fefefe
| 605204 ||  || — || November 22, 2014 || Mount Lemmon || Mount Lemmon Survey ||  || align=right data-sort-value="0.62" | 620 m || 
|-id=205 bgcolor=#E9E9E9
| 605205 ||  || — || October 30, 2014 || Haleakala || Pan-STARRS ||  || align=right data-sort-value="0.86" | 860 m || 
|-id=206 bgcolor=#d6d6d6
| 605206 ||  || — || February 13, 2008 || Mount Lemmon || Mount Lemmon Survey || 3:2 || align=right | 3.5 km || 
|-id=207 bgcolor=#E9E9E9
| 605207 ||  || — || January 8, 2016 || Haleakala || Pan-STARRS ||  || align=right | 1.3 km || 
|-id=208 bgcolor=#fefefe
| 605208 ||  || — || January 27, 2012 || Mount Lemmon || Mount Lemmon Survey ||  || align=right data-sort-value="0.56" | 560 m || 
|-id=209 bgcolor=#E9E9E9
| 605209 ||  || — || August 31, 2005 || Kitt Peak || Spacewatch ||  || align=right | 1.4 km || 
|-id=210 bgcolor=#E9E9E9
| 605210 ||  || — || July 14, 2013 || Haleakala || Pan-STARRS ||  || align=right data-sort-value="0.94" | 940 m || 
|-id=211 bgcolor=#d6d6d6
| 605211 ||  || — || March 13, 2005 || Kitt Peak || Spacewatch ||  || align=right | 2.3 km || 
|-id=212 bgcolor=#fefefe
| 605212 ||  || — || August 28, 1995 || Kitt Peak || Spacewatch ||  || align=right data-sort-value="0.67" | 670 m || 
|-id=213 bgcolor=#fefefe
| 605213 ||  || — || March 5, 2002 || Apache Point || SDSS Collaboration ||  || align=right data-sort-value="0.62" | 620 m || 
|-id=214 bgcolor=#fefefe
| 605214 ||  || — || March 10, 2005 || Mount Lemmon || Mount Lemmon Survey ||  || align=right data-sort-value="0.60" | 600 m || 
|-id=215 bgcolor=#fefefe
| 605215 ||  || — || January 26, 2012 || Mount Lemmon || Mount Lemmon Survey ||  || align=right data-sort-value="0.74" | 740 m || 
|-id=216 bgcolor=#fefefe
| 605216 ||  || — || March 1, 2016 || Haleakala || Pan-STARRS ||  || align=right data-sort-value="0.54" | 540 m || 
|-id=217 bgcolor=#fefefe
| 605217 ||  || — || March 9, 2005 || Mount Lemmon || Mount Lemmon Survey ||  || align=right data-sort-value="0.49" | 490 m || 
|-id=218 bgcolor=#fefefe
| 605218 ||  || — || February 19, 2009 || Kitt Peak || Spacewatch ||  || align=right data-sort-value="0.60" | 600 m || 
|-id=219 bgcolor=#fefefe
| 605219 ||  || — || December 14, 2003 || Kitt Peak || Spacewatch ||  || align=right data-sort-value="0.74" | 740 m || 
|-id=220 bgcolor=#fefefe
| 605220 ||  || — || March 19, 2009 || Kitt Peak || Spacewatch ||  || align=right data-sort-value="0.67" | 670 m || 
|-id=221 bgcolor=#fefefe
| 605221 ||  || — || February 27, 2009 || Kitt Peak || Spacewatch ||  || align=right data-sort-value="0.56" | 560 m || 
|-id=222 bgcolor=#fefefe
| 605222 ||  || — || February 4, 2005 || Kitt Peak || Spacewatch ||  || align=right data-sort-value="0.54" | 540 m || 
|-id=223 bgcolor=#fefefe
| 605223 ||  || — || March 29, 2009 || Kitt Peak || Spacewatch ||  || align=right data-sort-value="0.70" | 700 m || 
|-id=224 bgcolor=#E9E9E9
| 605224 ||  || — || March 10, 2016 || Haleakala || Pan-STARRS ||  || align=right | 2.1 km || 
|-id=225 bgcolor=#fefefe
| 605225 ||  || — || March 24, 2009 || Mount Lemmon || Mount Lemmon Survey ||  || align=right data-sort-value="0.61" | 610 m || 
|-id=226 bgcolor=#fefefe
| 605226 ||  || — || February 16, 2012 || Haleakala || Pan-STARRS ||  || align=right data-sort-value="0.64" | 640 m || 
|-id=227 bgcolor=#fefefe
| 605227 ||  || — || December 2, 2008 || Kitt Peak || Spacewatch ||  || align=right data-sort-value="0.51" | 510 m || 
|-id=228 bgcolor=#fefefe
| 605228 ||  || — || October 1, 2010 || Mount Lemmon || Mount Lemmon Survey ||  || align=right data-sort-value="0.56" | 560 m || 
|-id=229 bgcolor=#fefefe
| 605229 ||  || — || February 29, 2008 || Kitt Peak || Spacewatch ||  || align=right data-sort-value="0.56" | 560 m || 
|-id=230 bgcolor=#fefefe
| 605230 ||  || — || November 20, 2007 || Kitt Peak || Spacewatch ||  || align=right data-sort-value="0.81" | 810 m || 
|-id=231 bgcolor=#fefefe
| 605231 ||  || — || May 20, 2005 || Mount Lemmon || Mount Lemmon Survey || NYS || align=right data-sort-value="0.66" | 660 m || 
|-id=232 bgcolor=#d6d6d6
| 605232 ||  || — || October 30, 2008 || Kitt Peak || Spacewatch ||  || align=right | 2.3 km || 
|-id=233 bgcolor=#fefefe
| 605233 ||  || — || February 26, 2009 || Calar Alto || F. Hormuth ||  || align=right data-sort-value="0.65" | 650 m || 
|-id=234 bgcolor=#fefefe
| 605234 ||  || — || March 9, 2005 || Mount Lemmon || Mount Lemmon Survey ||  || align=right data-sort-value="0.51" | 510 m || 
|-id=235 bgcolor=#fefefe
| 605235 ||  || — || April 22, 2009 || Mount Lemmon || Mount Lemmon Survey ||  || align=right data-sort-value="0.55" | 550 m || 
|-id=236 bgcolor=#fefefe
| 605236 ||  || — || February 13, 2012 || Haleakala || Pan-STARRS ||  || align=right data-sort-value="0.75" | 750 m || 
|-id=237 bgcolor=#fefefe
| 605237 ||  || — || April 27, 2009 || Mount Lemmon || Mount Lemmon Survey ||  || align=right data-sort-value="0.63" | 630 m || 
|-id=238 bgcolor=#fefefe
| 605238 ||  || — || September 14, 2007 || Mount Lemmon || Mount Lemmon Survey ||  || align=right data-sort-value="0.62" | 620 m || 
|-id=239 bgcolor=#fefefe
| 605239 ||  || — || May 22, 2006 || Siding Spring || SSS ||  || align=right data-sort-value="0.64" | 640 m || 
|-id=240 bgcolor=#fefefe
| 605240 ||  || — || March 14, 2016 || Mount Lemmon || Mount Lemmon Survey ||  || align=right data-sort-value="0.56" | 560 m || 
|-id=241 bgcolor=#fefefe
| 605241 ||  || — || November 12, 2001 || Apache Point || SDSS Collaboration ||  || align=right data-sort-value="0.73" | 730 m || 
|-id=242 bgcolor=#fefefe
| 605242 ||  || — || October 11, 2010 || Mayhill-ISON || L. Elenin ||  || align=right data-sort-value="0.97" | 970 m || 
|-id=243 bgcolor=#fefefe
| 605243 ||  || — || September 17, 2010 || Mount Lemmon || Mount Lemmon Survey ||  || align=right data-sort-value="0.64" | 640 m || 
|-id=244 bgcolor=#fefefe
| 605244 ||  || — || January 16, 2005 || Kitt Peak || Spacewatch ||  || align=right data-sort-value="0.67" | 670 m || 
|-id=245 bgcolor=#fefefe
| 605245 ||  || — || December 15, 2007 || Mount Lemmon || Mount Lemmon Survey ||  || align=right data-sort-value="0.74" | 740 m || 
|-id=246 bgcolor=#fefefe
| 605246 ||  || — || March 13, 2012 || Mount Lemmon || Mount Lemmon Survey ||  || align=right data-sort-value="0.57" | 570 m || 
|-id=247 bgcolor=#fefefe
| 605247 ||  || — || March 16, 2012 || Mount Lemmon || Mount Lemmon Survey ||  || align=right data-sort-value="0.60" | 600 m || 
|-id=248 bgcolor=#fefefe
| 605248 ||  || — || November 17, 2014 || Mount Lemmon || Mount Lemmon Survey ||  || align=right data-sort-value="0.57" | 570 m || 
|-id=249 bgcolor=#E9E9E9
| 605249 ||  || — || May 1, 2012 || Mount Lemmon || Mount Lemmon Survey ||  || align=right | 1.2 km || 
|-id=250 bgcolor=#fefefe
| 605250 ||  || — || March 1, 2012 || Mount Lemmon || Mount Lemmon Survey ||  || align=right data-sort-value="0.62" | 620 m || 
|-id=251 bgcolor=#fefefe
| 605251 ||  || — || March 3, 2016 || Mount Lemmon || Mount Lemmon Survey ||  || align=right data-sort-value="0.65" | 650 m || 
|-id=252 bgcolor=#fefefe
| 605252 ||  || — || March 10, 2016 || Haleakala || Pan-STARRS ||  || align=right data-sort-value="0.69" | 690 m || 
|-id=253 bgcolor=#E9E9E9
| 605253 ||  || — || March 7, 2016 || Haleakala || Pan-STARRS ||  || align=right data-sort-value="0.66" | 660 m || 
|-id=254 bgcolor=#fefefe
| 605254 ||  || — || March 7, 2016 || Haleakala || Pan-STARRS ||  || align=right data-sort-value="0.57" | 570 m || 
|-id=255 bgcolor=#E9E9E9
| 605255 ||  || — || March 13, 2016 || Haleakala || Pan-STARRS ||  || align=right data-sort-value="0.70" | 700 m || 
|-id=256 bgcolor=#d6d6d6
| 605256 ||  || — || March 2, 2016 || Haleakala || Pan-STARRS ||  || align=right | 2.6 km || 
|-id=257 bgcolor=#fefefe
| 605257 ||  || — || November 18, 2007 || Mount Lemmon || Mount Lemmon Survey ||  || align=right data-sort-value="0.74" | 740 m || 
|-id=258 bgcolor=#fefefe
| 605258 ||  || — || March 17, 2009 || Kitt Peak || Spacewatch ||  || align=right data-sort-value="0.64" | 640 m || 
|-id=259 bgcolor=#fefefe
| 605259 ||  || — || June 20, 2013 || Haleakala || Pan-STARRS ||  || align=right data-sort-value="0.47" | 470 m || 
|-id=260 bgcolor=#fefefe
| 605260 ||  || — || November 20, 2014 || Haleakala || Pan-STARRS ||  || align=right data-sort-value="0.52" | 520 m || 
|-id=261 bgcolor=#E9E9E9
| 605261 ||  || — || December 23, 2006 || Mauna Kea || Mauna Kea Obs. ||  || align=right | 1.0 km || 
|-id=262 bgcolor=#E9E9E9
| 605262 ||  || — || December 8, 2005 || Kitt Peak || Spacewatch ||  || align=right | 1.9 km || 
|-id=263 bgcolor=#fefefe
| 605263 ||  || — || April 15, 2001 || Kitt Peak || Spacewatch ||  || align=right data-sort-value="0.61" | 610 m || 
|-id=264 bgcolor=#d6d6d6
| 605264 ||  || — || August 21, 2006 || Kitt Peak || Spacewatch ||  || align=right | 2.2 km || 
|-id=265 bgcolor=#fefefe
| 605265 ||  || — || February 2, 2008 || Mount Lemmon || Mount Lemmon Survey ||  || align=right data-sort-value="0.53" | 530 m || 
|-id=266 bgcolor=#fefefe
| 605266 ||  || — || January 12, 2002 || Kitt Peak || Spacewatch ||  || align=right data-sort-value="0.49" | 490 m || 
|-id=267 bgcolor=#E9E9E9
| 605267 ||  || — || January 15, 2016 || Haleakala || Pan-STARRS ||  || align=right | 1.4 km || 
|-id=268 bgcolor=#E9E9E9
| 605268 ||  || — || August 28, 2001 || Kitt Peak || Spacewatch ||  || align=right | 1.1 km || 
|-id=269 bgcolor=#fefefe
| 605269 ||  || — || March 10, 2016 || Haleakala || Pan-STARRS ||  || align=right data-sort-value="0.61" | 610 m || 
|-id=270 bgcolor=#E9E9E9
| 605270 ||  || — || March 12, 2003 || Kitt Peak || Spacewatch ||  || align=right | 1.0 km || 
|-id=271 bgcolor=#fefefe
| 605271 ||  || — || December 29, 2008 || Mount Lemmon || Mount Lemmon Survey ||  || align=right data-sort-value="0.63" | 630 m || 
|-id=272 bgcolor=#fefefe
| 605272 ||  || — || February 5, 2016 || Haleakala || Pan-STARRS ||  || align=right data-sort-value="0.55" | 550 m || 
|-id=273 bgcolor=#E9E9E9
| 605273 ||  || — || February 13, 2008 || Kitt Peak || Spacewatch ||  || align=right data-sort-value="0.80" | 800 m || 
|-id=274 bgcolor=#fefefe
| 605274 ||  || — || December 3, 2005 || Mauna Kea || Mauna Kea Obs. ||  || align=right data-sort-value="0.57" | 570 m || 
|-id=275 bgcolor=#fefefe
| 605275 ||  || — || January 30, 2008 || Kitt Peak || Spacewatch ||  || align=right data-sort-value="0.77" | 770 m || 
|-id=276 bgcolor=#E9E9E9
| 605276 ||  || — || November 26, 2014 || Haleakala || Pan-STARRS ||  || align=right | 1.3 km || 
|-id=277 bgcolor=#fefefe
| 605277 ||  || — || February 16, 2012 || Haleakala || Pan-STARRS ||  || align=right data-sort-value="0.93" | 930 m || 
|-id=278 bgcolor=#E9E9E9
| 605278 ||  || — || March 11, 2008 || Kitt Peak || Spacewatch ||  || align=right data-sort-value="0.68" | 680 m || 
|-id=279 bgcolor=#d6d6d6
| 605279 ||  || — || October 1, 2013 || Kitt Peak || Spacewatch ||  || align=right | 2.8 km || 
|-id=280 bgcolor=#fefefe
| 605280 ||  || — || March 1, 2009 || Kitt Peak || Spacewatch ||  || align=right data-sort-value="0.75" | 750 m || 
|-id=281 bgcolor=#E9E9E9
| 605281 ||  || — || April 26, 2006 || Cerro Tololo || Cerro Tololo Obs. ||  || align=right | 2.4 km || 
|-id=282 bgcolor=#fefefe
| 605282 ||  || — || April 23, 2009 || Kitt Peak || Spacewatch ||  || align=right data-sort-value="0.63" | 630 m || 
|-id=283 bgcolor=#fefefe
| 605283 ||  || — || July 14, 2013 || Haleakala || Pan-STARRS ||  || align=right data-sort-value="0.72" | 720 m || 
|-id=284 bgcolor=#fefefe
| 605284 ||  || — || March 31, 2016 || Haleakala || Pan-STARRS ||  || align=right data-sort-value="0.75" | 750 m || 
|-id=285 bgcolor=#fefefe
| 605285 ||  || — || March 18, 2016 || Mount Lemmon || Mount Lemmon Survey ||  || align=right data-sort-value="0.60" | 600 m || 
|-id=286 bgcolor=#fefefe
| 605286 ||  || — || March 30, 2016 || Haleakala || Pan-STARRS ||  || align=right data-sort-value="0.53" | 530 m || 
|-id=287 bgcolor=#d6d6d6
| 605287 ||  || — || August 16, 2013 || Haleakala || Pan-STARRS ||  || align=right | 3.1 km || 
|-id=288 bgcolor=#fefefe
| 605288 ||  || — || February 19, 2009 || Kitt Peak || Spacewatch ||  || align=right data-sort-value="0.54" | 540 m || 
|-id=289 bgcolor=#fefefe
| 605289 ||  || — || September 13, 2007 || Mount Lemmon || Mount Lemmon Survey ||  || align=right data-sort-value="0.50" | 500 m || 
|-id=290 bgcolor=#E9E9E9
| 605290 ||  || — || April 1, 2008 || Kitt Peak || Spacewatch ||  || align=right data-sort-value="0.62" | 620 m || 
|-id=291 bgcolor=#fefefe
| 605291 ||  || — || September 13, 2007 || Mount Lemmon || Mount Lemmon Survey ||  || align=right data-sort-value="0.67" | 670 m || 
|-id=292 bgcolor=#fefefe
| 605292 ||  || — || November 27, 2014 || Haleakala || Pan-STARRS ||  || align=right data-sort-value="0.58" | 580 m || 
|-id=293 bgcolor=#E9E9E9
| 605293 ||  || — || March 10, 2016 || Haleakala || Pan-STARRS ||  || align=right | 1.5 km || 
|-id=294 bgcolor=#fefefe
| 605294 ||  || — || August 14, 2006 || Siding Spring || SSS ||  || align=right data-sort-value="0.77" | 770 m || 
|-id=295 bgcolor=#d6d6d6
| 605295 ||  || — || January 8, 2016 || Haleakala || Pan-STARRS ||  || align=right | 2.7 km || 
|-id=296 bgcolor=#fefefe
| 605296 ||  || — || June 21, 2009 || Mount Lemmon || Mount Lemmon Survey ||  || align=right data-sort-value="0.91" | 910 m || 
|-id=297 bgcolor=#E9E9E9
| 605297 ||  || — || February 9, 2003 || Kitt Peak || Spacewatch ||  || align=right | 1.1 km || 
|-id=298 bgcolor=#fefefe
| 605298 ||  || — || February 20, 2009 || Kitt Peak || Spacewatch ||  || align=right data-sort-value="0.69" | 690 m || 
|-id=299 bgcolor=#fefefe
| 605299 ||  || — || March 22, 2009 || Mount Lemmon || Mount Lemmon Survey ||  || align=right data-sort-value="0.57" | 570 m || 
|-id=300 bgcolor=#fefefe
| 605300 ||  || — || October 26, 2011 || Haleakala || Pan-STARRS ||  || align=right data-sort-value="0.44" | 440 m || 
|}

605301–605400 

|-bgcolor=#fefefe
| 605301 ||  || — || March 20, 2002 || Kitt Peak || Spacewatch ||  || align=right data-sort-value="0.53" | 530 m || 
|-id=302 bgcolor=#fefefe
| 605302 ||  || — || September 29, 2010 || Mount Lemmon || Mount Lemmon Survey ||  || align=right data-sort-value="0.62" | 620 m || 
|-id=303 bgcolor=#fefefe
| 605303 ||  || — || September 15, 2010 || Kitt Peak || Spacewatch ||  || align=right data-sort-value="0.57" | 570 m || 
|-id=304 bgcolor=#fefefe
| 605304 ||  || — || March 4, 2016 || Haleakala || Pan-STARRS ||  || align=right data-sort-value="0.56" | 560 m || 
|-id=305 bgcolor=#fefefe
| 605305 ||  || — || February 21, 2009 || Cordell-Lorenz || D. T. Durig ||  || align=right data-sort-value="0.60" | 600 m || 
|-id=306 bgcolor=#E9E9E9
| 605306 ||  || — || March 20, 2007 || Mount Lemmon || Mount Lemmon Survey ||  || align=right | 1.0 km || 
|-id=307 bgcolor=#fefefe
| 605307 ||  || — || February 26, 2008 || Mount Lemmon || Mount Lemmon Survey ||  || align=right data-sort-value="0.73" | 730 m || 
|-id=308 bgcolor=#E9E9E9
| 605308 ||  || — || November 21, 2014 || Haleakala || Pan-STARRS ||  || align=right data-sort-value="0.76" | 760 m || 
|-id=309 bgcolor=#fefefe
| 605309 ||  || — || August 14, 2013 || Haleakala || Pan-STARRS ||  || align=right data-sort-value="0.62" | 620 m || 
|-id=310 bgcolor=#E9E9E9
| 605310 ||  || — || March 9, 2007 || Catalina || CSS ||  || align=right | 1.9 km || 
|-id=311 bgcolor=#d6d6d6
| 605311 ||  || — || September 14, 2006 || Kitt Peak || Spacewatch || 7:4 || align=right | 2.7 km || 
|-id=312 bgcolor=#E9E9E9
| 605312 ||  || — || November 16, 2009 || Mount Lemmon || Mount Lemmon Survey ||  || align=right | 1.2 km || 
|-id=313 bgcolor=#fefefe
| 605313 ||  || — || June 20, 2013 || Mount Lemmon || Mount Lemmon Survey ||  || align=right data-sort-value="0.66" | 660 m || 
|-id=314 bgcolor=#fefefe
| 605314 ||  || — || September 24, 2013 || Mount Lemmon || Mount Lemmon Survey ||  || align=right data-sort-value="0.60" | 600 m || 
|-id=315 bgcolor=#fefefe
| 605315 ||  || — || November 1, 2006 || Kitt Peak || Spacewatch ||  || align=right data-sort-value="0.61" | 610 m || 
|-id=316 bgcolor=#fefefe
| 605316 ||  || — || March 16, 2012 || Mount Lemmon || Mount Lemmon Survey ||  || align=right data-sort-value="0.64" | 640 m || 
|-id=317 bgcolor=#fefefe
| 605317 ||  || — || September 4, 2007 || Mount Lemmon || Mount Lemmon Survey ||  || align=right data-sort-value="0.59" | 590 m || 
|-id=318 bgcolor=#fefefe
| 605318 ||  || — || June 20, 2013 || Haleakala || Pan-STARRS ||  || align=right data-sort-value="0.64" | 640 m || 
|-id=319 bgcolor=#fefefe
| 605319 ||  || — || October 28, 2014 || Haleakala || Pan-STARRS ||  || align=right data-sort-value="0.51" | 510 m || 
|-id=320 bgcolor=#d6d6d6
| 605320 ||  || — || October 17, 2007 || Mount Lemmon || Mount Lemmon Survey ||  || align=right | 2.7 km || 
|-id=321 bgcolor=#fefefe
| 605321 ||  || — || June 21, 2010 || Mount Lemmon || Mount Lemmon Survey ||  || align=right data-sort-value="0.56" | 560 m || 
|-id=322 bgcolor=#d6d6d6
| 605322 ||  || — || January 11, 2010 || Mount Lemmon || Mount Lemmon Survey ||  || align=right | 2.1 km || 
|-id=323 bgcolor=#E9E9E9
| 605323 ||  || — || January 30, 2011 || Haleakala || Pan-STARRS ||  || align=right | 1.4 km || 
|-id=324 bgcolor=#fefefe
| 605324 ||  || — || September 1, 2013 || Haleakala || Pan-STARRS ||  || align=right data-sort-value="0.58" | 580 m || 
|-id=325 bgcolor=#fefefe
| 605325 ||  || — || April 1, 2016 || Haleakala || Pan-STARRS ||  || align=right data-sort-value="0.64" | 640 m || 
|-id=326 bgcolor=#fefefe
| 605326 ||  || — || March 10, 2016 || Haleakala || Pan-STARRS ||  || align=right data-sort-value="0.59" | 590 m || 
|-id=327 bgcolor=#fefefe
| 605327 ||  || — || September 6, 2013 || Catalina || CSS ||  || align=right data-sort-value="0.66" | 660 m || 
|-id=328 bgcolor=#d6d6d6
| 605328 ||  || — || August 18, 2006 || Kitt Peak || Spacewatch ||  || align=right | 2.4 km || 
|-id=329 bgcolor=#fefefe
| 605329 ||  || — || February 27, 2012 || Kitt Peak || Spacewatch ||  || align=right data-sort-value="0.65" | 650 m || 
|-id=330 bgcolor=#fefefe
| 605330 ||  || — || August 14, 2013 || Haleakala || Pan-STARRS ||  || align=right data-sort-value="0.63" | 630 m || 
|-id=331 bgcolor=#E9E9E9
| 605331 ||  || — || June 9, 2012 || Mount Lemmon || Mount Lemmon Survey ||  || align=right | 1.4 km || 
|-id=332 bgcolor=#fefefe
| 605332 ||  || — || January 11, 2008 || Kitt Peak || Spacewatch ||  || align=right data-sort-value="0.63" | 630 m || 
|-id=333 bgcolor=#d6d6d6
| 605333 ||  || — || September 18, 2012 || Mount Lemmon || Mount Lemmon Survey ||  || align=right | 2.3 km || 
|-id=334 bgcolor=#fefefe
| 605334 ||  || — || April 4, 2002 || Palomar || NEAT ||  || align=right | 1.0 km || 
|-id=335 bgcolor=#E9E9E9
| 605335 ||  || — || February 12, 2011 || Mount Lemmon || Mount Lemmon Survey ||  || align=right | 1.9 km || 
|-id=336 bgcolor=#E9E9E9
| 605336 ||  || — || December 25, 2010 || Mount Lemmon || Mount Lemmon Survey ||  || align=right data-sort-value="0.91" | 910 m || 
|-id=337 bgcolor=#E9E9E9
| 605337 ||  || — || May 21, 2012 || Haleakala || Pan-STARRS ||  || align=right | 1.3 km || 
|-id=338 bgcolor=#FA8072
| 605338 ||  || — || July 10, 2007 || Siding Spring || SSS ||  || align=right data-sort-value="0.70" | 700 m || 
|-id=339 bgcolor=#fefefe
| 605339 ||  || — || June 18, 2013 || Haleakala || Pan-STARRS ||  || align=right data-sort-value="0.57" | 570 m || 
|-id=340 bgcolor=#E9E9E9
| 605340 ||  || — || November 4, 2014 || Mount Lemmon || Mount Lemmon Survey ||  || align=right | 1.1 km || 
|-id=341 bgcolor=#d6d6d6
| 605341 ||  || — || June 6, 2011 || Haleakala || Pan-STARRS ||  || align=right | 2.2 km || 
|-id=342 bgcolor=#fefefe
| 605342 ||  || — || October 25, 2014 || Haleakala || Pan-STARRS ||  || align=right data-sort-value="0.85" | 850 m || 
|-id=343 bgcolor=#fefefe
| 605343 ||  || — || March 20, 2012 || Haleakala || Pan-STARRS ||  || align=right data-sort-value="0.63" | 630 m || 
|-id=344 bgcolor=#fefefe
| 605344 ||  || — || January 16, 2005 || Kitt Peak || Spacewatch ||  || align=right data-sort-value="0.60" | 600 m || 
|-id=345 bgcolor=#fefefe
| 605345 ||  || — || February 19, 2012 || Kitt Peak || Spacewatch ||  || align=right data-sort-value="0.72" | 720 m || 
|-id=346 bgcolor=#fefefe
| 605346 ||  || — || April 18, 2009 || Mount Lemmon || Mount Lemmon Survey ||  || align=right data-sort-value="0.76" | 760 m || 
|-id=347 bgcolor=#fefefe
| 605347 ||  || — || March 12, 2016 || Haleakala || Pan-STARRS ||  || align=right data-sort-value="0.58" | 580 m || 
|-id=348 bgcolor=#fefefe
| 605348 ||  || — || April 2, 2005 || Kitt Peak || Spacewatch ||  || align=right data-sort-value="0.63" | 630 m || 
|-id=349 bgcolor=#fefefe
| 605349 ||  || — || March 2, 2009 || Mount Lemmon || Mount Lemmon Survey ||  || align=right data-sort-value="0.60" | 600 m || 
|-id=350 bgcolor=#fefefe
| 605350 ||  || — || May 14, 2009 || Kitt Peak || Spacewatch ||  || align=right data-sort-value="0.73" | 730 m || 
|-id=351 bgcolor=#fefefe
| 605351 ||  || — || January 18, 2012 || Mount Lemmon || Mount Lemmon Survey ||  || align=right data-sort-value="0.64" | 640 m || 
|-id=352 bgcolor=#fefefe
| 605352 ||  || — || January 1, 2012 || Mount Lemmon || Mount Lemmon Survey ||  || align=right data-sort-value="0.70" | 700 m || 
|-id=353 bgcolor=#fefefe
| 605353 ||  || — || May 14, 2005 || Mount Lemmon || Mount Lemmon Survey ||  || align=right data-sort-value="0.75" | 750 m || 
|-id=354 bgcolor=#fefefe
| 605354 ||  || — || December 6, 2011 || Haleakala || Pan-STARRS ||  || align=right data-sort-value="0.50" | 500 m || 
|-id=355 bgcolor=#fefefe
| 605355 ||  || — || October 8, 2007 || Mount Lemmon || Mount Lemmon Survey ||  || align=right data-sort-value="0.55" | 550 m || 
|-id=356 bgcolor=#fefefe
| 605356 ||  || — || October 2, 2003 || Kitt Peak || Spacewatch ||  || align=right data-sort-value="0.69" | 690 m || 
|-id=357 bgcolor=#fefefe
| 605357 ||  || — || April 22, 2009 || Mount Lemmon || Mount Lemmon Survey ||  || align=right data-sort-value="0.71" | 710 m || 
|-id=358 bgcolor=#fefefe
| 605358 ||  || — || March 20, 2001 || Kitt Peak || Spacewatch ||  || align=right data-sort-value="0.71" | 710 m || 
|-id=359 bgcolor=#C2FFFF
| 605359 ||  || — || November 13, 2010 || Mount Lemmon || Mount Lemmon Survey || L4 || align=right | 7.1 km || 
|-id=360 bgcolor=#fefefe
| 605360 ||  || — || October 17, 2010 || Mount Lemmon || Mount Lemmon Survey ||  || align=right data-sort-value="0.77" | 770 m || 
|-id=361 bgcolor=#fefefe
| 605361 ||  || — || July 14, 2013 || Haleakala || Pan-STARRS ||  || align=right data-sort-value="0.72" | 720 m || 
|-id=362 bgcolor=#fefefe
| 605362 ||  || — || March 13, 2012 || Mount Lemmon || Mount Lemmon Survey ||  || align=right data-sort-value="0.60" | 600 m || 
|-id=363 bgcolor=#fefefe
| 605363 ||  || — || March 6, 2016 || Haleakala || Pan-STARRS ||  || align=right data-sort-value="0.74" | 740 m || 
|-id=364 bgcolor=#fefefe
| 605364 ||  || — || November 20, 2014 || Haleakala || Pan-STARRS ||  || align=right data-sort-value="0.58" | 580 m || 
|-id=365 bgcolor=#fefefe
| 605365 ||  || — || July 19, 2006 || Mauna Kea || Mauna Kea Obs. ||  || align=right data-sort-value="0.53" | 530 m || 
|-id=366 bgcolor=#fefefe
| 605366 ||  || — || May 4, 2005 || Kitt Peak || Spacewatch ||  || align=right data-sort-value="0.75" | 750 m || 
|-id=367 bgcolor=#d6d6d6
| 605367 ||  || — || September 11, 2007 || Mount Lemmon || Mount Lemmon Survey ||  || align=right | 2.3 km || 
|-id=368 bgcolor=#E9E9E9
| 605368 ||  || — || June 15, 2012 || Kitt Peak || Spacewatch ||  || align=right data-sort-value="0.82" | 820 m || 
|-id=369 bgcolor=#fefefe
| 605369 ||  || — || February 4, 2012 || Haleakala || Pan-STARRS ||  || align=right data-sort-value="0.70" | 700 m || 
|-id=370 bgcolor=#E9E9E9
| 605370 ||  || — || December 15, 2014 || Mount Lemmon || Mount Lemmon Survey ||  || align=right data-sort-value="0.96" | 960 m || 
|-id=371 bgcolor=#E9E9E9
| 605371 ||  || — || January 16, 2011 || Mount Lemmon || Mount Lemmon Survey ||  || align=right | 1.0 km || 
|-id=372 bgcolor=#fefefe
| 605372 ||  || — || April 21, 1996 || Kitt Peak || Spacewatch ||  || align=right data-sort-value="0.78" | 780 m || 
|-id=373 bgcolor=#fefefe
| 605373 ||  || — || April 30, 2009 || Kitt Peak || Spacewatch ||  || align=right data-sort-value="0.57" | 570 m || 
|-id=374 bgcolor=#E9E9E9
| 605374 ||  || — || September 7, 2004 || Kitt Peak || Spacewatch ||  || align=right data-sort-value="0.62" | 620 m || 
|-id=375 bgcolor=#fefefe
| 605375 ||  || — || February 3, 2012 || Haleakala || Pan-STARRS ||  || align=right data-sort-value="0.71" | 710 m || 
|-id=376 bgcolor=#fefefe
| 605376 ||  || — || February 16, 2012 || Haleakala || Pan-STARRS ||  || align=right data-sort-value="0.90" | 900 m || 
|-id=377 bgcolor=#fefefe
| 605377 ||  || — || August 25, 2014 || Haleakala || Pan-STARRS ||  || align=right data-sort-value="0.61" | 610 m || 
|-id=378 bgcolor=#fefefe
| 605378 ||  || — || October 11, 2007 || Mount Lemmon || Mount Lemmon Survey ||  || align=right data-sort-value="0.60" | 600 m || 
|-id=379 bgcolor=#fefefe
| 605379 ||  || — || November 9, 2007 || Mount Lemmon || Mount Lemmon Survey ||  || align=right data-sort-value="0.61" | 610 m || 
|-id=380 bgcolor=#fefefe
| 605380 ||  || — || January 19, 2008 || Mount Lemmon || Mount Lemmon Survey ||  || align=right data-sort-value="0.97" | 970 m || 
|-id=381 bgcolor=#fefefe
| 605381 ||  || — || January 11, 2008 || Kitt Peak || Spacewatch ||  || align=right data-sort-value="0.76" | 760 m || 
|-id=382 bgcolor=#d6d6d6
| 605382 ||  || — || October 31, 2013 || Kitt Peak || Spacewatch || 3:2 || align=right | 4.4 km || 
|-id=383 bgcolor=#fefefe
| 605383 ||  || — || October 4, 2014 || Kitt Peak || Spacewatch ||  || align=right data-sort-value="0.52" | 520 m || 
|-id=384 bgcolor=#fefefe
| 605384 ||  || — || October 23, 2003 || Kitt Peak || L. H. Wasserman, D. E. Trilling ||  || align=right data-sort-value="0.53" | 530 m || 
|-id=385 bgcolor=#fefefe
| 605385 ||  || — || June 8, 2005 || Kitt Peak || Spacewatch || V || align=right data-sort-value="0.50" | 500 m || 
|-id=386 bgcolor=#fefefe
| 605386 ||  || — || July 14, 2013 || Haleakala || Pan-STARRS ||  || align=right data-sort-value="0.64" | 640 m || 
|-id=387 bgcolor=#E9E9E9
| 605387 ||  || — || September 26, 2006 || Mount Lemmon || Mount Lemmon Survey ||  || align=right data-sort-value="0.72" | 720 m || 
|-id=388 bgcolor=#fefefe
| 605388 ||  || — || December 30, 2011 || Kitt Peak || Spacewatch ||  || align=right data-sort-value="0.48" | 480 m || 
|-id=389 bgcolor=#fefefe
| 605389 ||  || — || June 29, 2005 || Palomar || NEAT ||  || align=right data-sort-value="0.91" | 910 m || 
|-id=390 bgcolor=#fefefe
| 605390 ||  || — || February 3, 2009 || Kitt Peak || Spacewatch ||  || align=right data-sort-value="0.50" | 500 m || 
|-id=391 bgcolor=#fefefe
| 605391 ||  || — || March 29, 2009 || Kitt Peak || Spacewatch ||  || align=right data-sort-value="0.58" | 580 m || 
|-id=392 bgcolor=#E9E9E9
| 605392 ||  || — || November 9, 2009 || Mount Lemmon || Mount Lemmon Survey ||  || align=right | 2.6 km || 
|-id=393 bgcolor=#E9E9E9
| 605393 ||  || — || December 14, 2010 || Kitt Peak || Spacewatch ||  || align=right | 1.0 km || 
|-id=394 bgcolor=#E9E9E9
| 605394 ||  || — || March 31, 2016 || Mount Lemmon || Mount Lemmon Survey ||  || align=right | 1.1 km || 
|-id=395 bgcolor=#fefefe
| 605395 ||  || — || September 12, 2007 || Kitt Peak || Spacewatch ||  || align=right data-sort-value="0.59" | 590 m || 
|-id=396 bgcolor=#d6d6d6
| 605396 ||  || — || June 1, 2005 || Mount Lemmon || Mount Lemmon Survey ||  || align=right | 2.9 km || 
|-id=397 bgcolor=#fefefe
| 605397 ||  || — || May 21, 2006 || Kitt Peak || Spacewatch ||  || align=right data-sort-value="0.63" | 630 m || 
|-id=398 bgcolor=#fefefe
| 605398 ||  || — || May 10, 2005 || Cerro Tololo || M. W. Buie, L. H. Wasserman || NYS || align=right data-sort-value="0.59" | 590 m || 
|-id=399 bgcolor=#fefefe
| 605399 ||  || — || February 25, 2012 || Kitt Peak || Spacewatch ||  || align=right data-sort-value="0.69" | 690 m || 
|-id=400 bgcolor=#fefefe
| 605400 ||  || — || March 4, 2016 || Haleakala || Pan-STARRS ||  || align=right data-sort-value="0.73" | 730 m || 
|}

605401–605500 

|-bgcolor=#fefefe
| 605401 ||  || — || September 17, 2014 || Haleakala || Pan-STARRS ||  || align=right data-sort-value="0.59" | 590 m || 
|-id=402 bgcolor=#fefefe
| 605402 ||  || — || March 11, 2005 || Mount Lemmon || Mount Lemmon Survey ||  || align=right data-sort-value="0.64" | 640 m || 
|-id=403 bgcolor=#E9E9E9
| 605403 ||  || — || May 21, 2012 || Mount Lemmon || Mount Lemmon Survey ||  || align=right data-sort-value="0.82" | 820 m || 
|-id=404 bgcolor=#fefefe
| 605404 ||  || — || January 11, 2008 || Kitt Peak || Spacewatch ||  || align=right data-sort-value="0.63" | 630 m || 
|-id=405 bgcolor=#E9E9E9
| 605405 ||  || — || April 4, 2016 || Mount Lemmon || Mount Lemmon Survey ||  || align=right | 1.2 km || 
|-id=406 bgcolor=#E9E9E9
| 605406 ||  || — || April 9, 2016 || Haleakala || Pan-STARRS ||  || align=right data-sort-value="0.95" | 950 m || 
|-id=407 bgcolor=#E9E9E9
| 605407 ||  || — || April 1, 2016 || Haleakala || Pan-STARRS ||  || align=right | 2.1 km || 
|-id=408 bgcolor=#E9E9E9
| 605408 ||  || — || February 27, 2006 || Mount Lemmon || Mount Lemmon Survey ||  || align=right | 1.6 km || 
|-id=409 bgcolor=#E9E9E9
| 605409 ||  || — || April 1, 2016 || Haleakala || Pan-STARRS ||  || align=right | 1.7 km || 
|-id=410 bgcolor=#d6d6d6
| 605410 ||  || — || April 2, 2016 || Haleakala || Pan-STARRS ||  || align=right | 2.3 km || 
|-id=411 bgcolor=#E9E9E9
| 605411 ||  || — || April 12, 2016 || Haleakala || Pan-STARRS ||  || align=right data-sort-value="0.97" | 970 m || 
|-id=412 bgcolor=#E9E9E9
| 605412 ||  || — || April 1, 2016 || Haleakala || Pan-STARRS ||  || align=right data-sort-value="0.82" | 820 m || 
|-id=413 bgcolor=#FA8072
| 605413 ||  || — || April 18, 2016 || Mount Lemmon || Mount Lemmon Survey ||  || align=right data-sort-value="0.48" | 480 m || 
|-id=414 bgcolor=#fefefe
| 605414 ||  || — || February 16, 2005 || La Silla || A. Boattini ||  || align=right data-sort-value="0.74" | 740 m || 
|-id=415 bgcolor=#fefefe
| 605415 ||  || — || March 13, 2005 || Kitt Peak || Spacewatch ||  || align=right data-sort-value="0.53" | 530 m || 
|-id=416 bgcolor=#d6d6d6
| 605416 ||  || — || September 14, 2007 || Mount Lemmon || Mount Lemmon Survey ||  || align=right | 2.2 km || 
|-id=417 bgcolor=#fefefe
| 605417 ||  || — || February 16, 2012 || Haleakala || Pan-STARRS ||  || align=right data-sort-value="0.58" | 580 m || 
|-id=418 bgcolor=#C2FFFF
| 605418 ||  || — || April 30, 2016 || Haleakala || Pan-STARRS || L4 || align=right | 5.9 km || 
|-id=419 bgcolor=#fefefe
| 605419 ||  || — || February 20, 2012 || Mount Graham || R. P. Boyle ||  || align=right data-sort-value="0.71" | 710 m || 
|-id=420 bgcolor=#fefefe
| 605420 ||  || — || February 11, 2016 || Haleakala || Pan-STARRS ||  || align=right data-sort-value="0.61" | 610 m || 
|-id=421 bgcolor=#E9E9E9
| 605421 ||  || — || April 2, 2016 || Haleakala || Pan-STARRS ||  || align=right | 1.7 km || 
|-id=422 bgcolor=#fefefe
| 605422 ||  || — || February 12, 2016 || Haleakala || Pan-STARRS ||  || align=right data-sort-value="0.52" | 520 m || 
|-id=423 bgcolor=#fefefe
| 605423 ||  || — || March 27, 2012 || Mount Lemmon || Mount Lemmon Survey ||  || align=right data-sort-value="0.96" | 960 m || 
|-id=424 bgcolor=#fefefe
| 605424 ||  || — || April 20, 2013 || Charleston || R. Holmes ||  || align=right data-sort-value="0.75" | 750 m || 
|-id=425 bgcolor=#E9E9E9
| 605425 ||  || — || June 9, 2012 || Nogales || M. Schwartz, P. R. Holvorcem ||  || align=right data-sort-value="0.78" | 780 m || 
|-id=426 bgcolor=#fefefe
| 605426 ||  || — || March 4, 2016 || Haleakala || Pan-STARRS ||  || align=right data-sort-value="0.81" | 810 m || 
|-id=427 bgcolor=#E9E9E9
| 605427 ||  || — || September 4, 2013 || Mount Lemmon || Mount Lemmon Survey ||  || align=right | 1.4 km || 
|-id=428 bgcolor=#fefefe
| 605428 ||  || — || February 7, 2008 || Kitt Peak || Spacewatch ||  || align=right data-sort-value="0.92" | 920 m || 
|-id=429 bgcolor=#fefefe
| 605429 ||  || — || October 6, 2013 || Catalina || CSS ||  || align=right data-sort-value="0.79" | 790 m || 
|-id=430 bgcolor=#fefefe
| 605430 ||  || — || February 10, 2008 || Kitt Peak || Spacewatch ||  || align=right data-sort-value="0.95" | 950 m || 
|-id=431 bgcolor=#d6d6d6
| 605431 ||  || — || May 8, 2011 || Mount Lemmon || Mount Lemmon Survey ||  || align=right | 2.5 km || 
|-id=432 bgcolor=#E9E9E9
| 605432 ||  || — || November 10, 2013 || Mount Lemmon || Mount Lemmon Survey ||  || align=right | 1.0 km || 
|-id=433 bgcolor=#E9E9E9
| 605433 ||  || — || May 3, 2016 || Haleakala || Pan-STARRS ||  || align=right | 1.2 km || 
|-id=434 bgcolor=#E9E9E9
| 605434 ||  || — || January 22, 2015 || Haleakala || Pan-STARRS ||  || align=right data-sort-value="0.72" | 720 m || 
|-id=435 bgcolor=#fefefe
| 605435 ||  || — || May 3, 2016 || Mount Lemmon || Mount Lemmon Survey ||  || align=right data-sort-value="0.67" | 670 m || 
|-id=436 bgcolor=#fefefe
| 605436 ||  || — || April 20, 2006 || Siding Spring || SSS ||  || align=right | 1.2 km || 
|-id=437 bgcolor=#fefefe
| 605437 ||  || — || April 1, 2016 || Mount Lemmon || Mount Lemmon Survey || H || align=right data-sort-value="0.57" | 570 m || 
|-id=438 bgcolor=#E9E9E9
| 605438 ||  || — || September 6, 2012 || Haleakala || Pan-STARRS ||  || align=right | 1.1 km || 
|-id=439 bgcolor=#FA8072
| 605439 ||  || — || August 13, 2006 || Palomar || NEAT ||  || align=right data-sort-value="0.83" | 830 m || 
|-id=440 bgcolor=#fefefe
| 605440 ||  || — || February 11, 2013 || Haleakala || Pan-STARRS || H || align=right data-sort-value="0.48" | 480 m || 
|-id=441 bgcolor=#C2FFFF
| 605441 ||  || — || May 13, 2004 || Kitt Peak || Spacewatch || L4 || align=right | 9.6 km || 
|-id=442 bgcolor=#fefefe
| 605442 ||  || — || April 12, 2005 || Mount Lemmon || Mount Lemmon Survey ||  || align=right data-sort-value="0.71" | 710 m || 
|-id=443 bgcolor=#fefefe
| 605443 ||  || — || April 12, 2012 || Haleakala || Pan-STARRS ||  || align=right data-sort-value="0.64" | 640 m || 
|-id=444 bgcolor=#C2FFFF
| 605444 ||  || — || November 2, 2010 || Kitt Peak || Spacewatch || L4 || align=right | 7.1 km || 
|-id=445 bgcolor=#fefefe
| 605445 ||  || — || February 13, 2012 || Haleakala || Pan-STARRS ||  || align=right data-sort-value="0.60" | 600 m || 
|-id=446 bgcolor=#fefefe
| 605446 ||  || — || October 2, 2002 || Haleakala || AMOS ||  || align=right | 1.1 km || 
|-id=447 bgcolor=#E9E9E9
| 605447 ||  || — || May 30, 2016 || Haleakala || Pan-STARRS ||  || align=right | 1.1 km || 
|-id=448 bgcolor=#E9E9E9
| 605448 ||  || — || October 9, 2008 || Mount Lemmon || Mount Lemmon Survey ||  || align=right | 1.0 km || 
|-id=449 bgcolor=#E9E9E9
| 605449 ||  || — || October 2, 2013 || Haleakala || Pan-STARRS ||  || align=right | 1.6 km || 
|-id=450 bgcolor=#fefefe
| 605450 ||  || — || March 7, 2008 || Mount Lemmon || Mount Lemmon Survey ||  || align=right data-sort-value="0.70" | 700 m || 
|-id=451 bgcolor=#fefefe
| 605451 ||  || — || April 2, 2009 || Mount Lemmon || Mount Lemmon Survey ||  || align=right data-sort-value="0.58" | 580 m || 
|-id=452 bgcolor=#fefefe
| 605452 ||  || — || June 5, 2016 || Haleakala || Pan-STARRS ||  || align=right data-sort-value="0.57" | 570 m || 
|-id=453 bgcolor=#E9E9E9
| 605453 ||  || — || March 31, 2003 || Kitt Peak || Spacewatch ||  || align=right | 1.2 km || 
|-id=454 bgcolor=#E9E9E9
| 605454 ||  || — || September 19, 2003 || Kitt Peak || Spacewatch ||  || align=right | 1.9 km || 
|-id=455 bgcolor=#d6d6d6
| 605455 ||  || — || June 7, 2016 || Haleakala || Pan-STARRS ||  || align=right | 2.6 km || 
|-id=456 bgcolor=#E9E9E9
| 605456 ||  || — || September 18, 2003 || Palomar || NEAT ||  || align=right | 2.0 km || 
|-id=457 bgcolor=#E9E9E9
| 605457 ||  || — || February 28, 2006 || Mount Lemmon || Mount Lemmon Survey ||  || align=right | 1.3 km || 
|-id=458 bgcolor=#d6d6d6
| 605458 ||  || — || June 7, 2016 || Haleakala || Pan-STARRS ||  || align=right | 2.6 km || 
|-id=459 bgcolor=#E9E9E9
| 605459 ||  || — || May 13, 2015 || Mount Lemmon || Mount Lemmon Survey ||  || align=right | 1.1 km || 
|-id=460 bgcolor=#E9E9E9
| 605460 ||  || — || June 5, 2016 || Haleakala || Pan-STARRS ||  || align=right data-sort-value="0.79" | 790 m || 
|-id=461 bgcolor=#d6d6d6
| 605461 ||  || — || September 19, 2001 || Kitt Peak || Spacewatch ||  || align=right | 2.1 km || 
|-id=462 bgcolor=#E9E9E9
| 605462 ||  || — || April 13, 2011 || Mount Lemmon || Mount Lemmon Survey ||  || align=right | 1.1 km || 
|-id=463 bgcolor=#d6d6d6
| 605463 ||  || — || December 9, 2006 || Palomar || NEAT ||  || align=right | 4.1 km || 
|-id=464 bgcolor=#d6d6d6
| 605464 ||  || — || June 7, 2016 || Haleakala || Pan-STARRS ||  || align=right | 2.0 km || 
|-id=465 bgcolor=#E9E9E9
| 605465 ||  || — || February 20, 2015 || Haleakala || Pan-STARRS ||  || align=right | 1.2 km || 
|-id=466 bgcolor=#fefefe
| 605466 ||  || — || February 12, 2008 || Mount Lemmon || Mount Lemmon Survey ||  || align=right data-sort-value="0.67" | 670 m || 
|-id=467 bgcolor=#E9E9E9
| 605467 ||  || — || March 18, 2016 || Haleakala || Pan-STARRS ||  || align=right | 1.8 km || 
|-id=468 bgcolor=#d6d6d6
| 605468 ||  || — || September 14, 2007 || Mount Lemmon || Mount Lemmon Survey ||  || align=right | 2.2 km || 
|-id=469 bgcolor=#fefefe
| 605469 ||  || — || June 8, 2016 || Haleakala || Pan-STARRS ||  || align=right data-sort-value="0.64" | 640 m || 
|-id=470 bgcolor=#d6d6d6
| 605470 ||  || — || June 7, 2016 || Haleakala || Pan-STARRS ||  || align=right | 2.0 km || 
|-id=471 bgcolor=#d6d6d6
| 605471 ||  || — || June 7, 2016 || Haleakala || Pan-STARRS ||  || align=right | 2.6 km || 
|-id=472 bgcolor=#fefefe
| 605472 ||  || — || May 14, 2002 || Palomar || NEAT ||  || align=right | 1.4 km || 
|-id=473 bgcolor=#d6d6d6
| 605473 ||  || — || July 24, 2001 || Palomar || NEAT ||  || align=right | 3.7 km || 
|-id=474 bgcolor=#fefefe
| 605474 ||  || — || April 11, 2005 || Mount Lemmon || Mount Lemmon Survey ||  || align=right data-sort-value="0.74" | 740 m || 
|-id=475 bgcolor=#E9E9E9
| 605475 ||  || — || June 5, 2016 || Haleakala || Pan-STARRS ||  || align=right data-sort-value="0.70" | 700 m || 
|-id=476 bgcolor=#E9E9E9
| 605476 ||  || — || September 20, 2003 || Palomar || NEAT ||  || align=right | 1.9 km || 
|-id=477 bgcolor=#d6d6d6
| 605477 ||  || — || June 29, 2016 || Haleakala || Pan-STARRS ||  || align=right | 2.6 km || 
|-id=478 bgcolor=#FA8072
| 605478 ||  || — || September 14, 2013 || Haleakala || Pan-STARRS ||  || align=right data-sort-value="0.58" | 580 m || 
|-id=479 bgcolor=#E9E9E9
| 605479 ||  || — || October 17, 2012 || Mount Lemmon || Mount Lemmon Survey ||  || align=right | 1.9 km || 
|-id=480 bgcolor=#E9E9E9
| 605480 ||  || — || August 8, 2012 || Haleakala || Pan-STARRS ||  || align=right | 1.0 km || 
|-id=481 bgcolor=#E9E9E9
| 605481 ||  || — || December 8, 2005 || Kitt Peak || Spacewatch ||  || align=right | 1.3 km || 
|-id=482 bgcolor=#fefefe
| 605482 ||  || — || August 27, 2009 || Kitt Peak || Spacewatch ||  || align=right data-sort-value="0.63" | 630 m || 
|-id=483 bgcolor=#fefefe
| 605483 ||  || — || January 1, 2014 || Mount Lemmon || Mount Lemmon Survey ||  || align=right data-sort-value="0.62" | 620 m || 
|-id=484 bgcolor=#E9E9E9
| 605484 ||  || — || November 27, 2013 || Haleakala || Pan-STARRS ||  || align=right | 1.1 km || 
|-id=485 bgcolor=#fefefe
| 605485 ||  || — || April 14, 2008 || Mount Lemmon || Mount Lemmon Survey ||  || align=right data-sort-value="0.69" | 690 m || 
|-id=486 bgcolor=#FA8072
| 605486 ||  || — || October 11, 2006 || Palomar || NEAT ||  || align=right data-sort-value="0.70" | 700 m || 
|-id=487 bgcolor=#FA8072
| 605487 ||  || — || November 12, 2010 || Mount Lemmon || Mount Lemmon Survey ||  || align=right data-sort-value="0.60" | 600 m || 
|-id=488 bgcolor=#fefefe
| 605488 ||  || — || September 23, 2009 || Mount Lemmon || Mount Lemmon Survey ||  || align=right data-sort-value="0.56" | 560 m || 
|-id=489 bgcolor=#FFC2E0
| 605489 ||  || — || September 13, 2013 || Kitt Peak || Spacewatch || AMO || align=right data-sort-value="0.21" | 210 m || 
|-id=490 bgcolor=#E9E9E9
| 605490 ||  || — || April 9, 2003 || Palomar || NEAT ||  || align=right | 1.1 km || 
|-id=491 bgcolor=#E9E9E9
| 605491 ||  || — || April 6, 2011 || Kitt Peak || Spacewatch ||  || align=right data-sort-value="0.82" | 820 m || 
|-id=492 bgcolor=#d6d6d6
| 605492 ||  || — || March 29, 2014 || Mount Lemmon || Mount Lemmon Survey ||  || align=right | 2.6 km || 
|-id=493 bgcolor=#E9E9E9
| 605493 ||  || — || April 20, 2007 || Mount Lemmon || Mount Lemmon Survey ||  || align=right | 1.0 km || 
|-id=494 bgcolor=#d6d6d6
| 605494 ||  || — || July 30, 2005 || Palomar || NEAT ||  || align=right | 3.2 km || 
|-id=495 bgcolor=#E9E9E9
| 605495 ||  || — || June 17, 2012 || Mount Lemmon || Mount Lemmon Survey ||  || align=right | 1.3 km || 
|-id=496 bgcolor=#E9E9E9
| 605496 ||  || — || February 9, 2014 || Haleakala || Pan-STARRS ||  || align=right | 1.7 km || 
|-id=497 bgcolor=#E9E9E9
| 605497 ||  || — || September 26, 2003 || Apache Point || SDSS Collaboration ||  || align=right | 1.6 km || 
|-id=498 bgcolor=#fefefe
| 605498 ||  || — || April 20, 2009 || Kitt Peak || Spacewatch ||  || align=right data-sort-value="0.53" | 530 m || 
|-id=499 bgcolor=#d6d6d6
| 605499 ||  || — || August 30, 2011 || Zelenchukskaya Stn || T. V. Kryachko, B. Satovski ||  || align=right | 3.4 km || 
|-id=500 bgcolor=#fefefe
| 605500 ||  || — || February 9, 2015 || Mount Lemmon || Mount Lemmon Survey ||  || align=right data-sort-value="0.67" | 670 m || 
|}

605501–605600 

|-bgcolor=#fefefe
| 605501 ||  || — || July 5, 2016 || Mount Lemmon || Mount Lemmon Survey ||  || align=right data-sort-value="0.68" | 680 m || 
|-id=502 bgcolor=#fefefe
| 605502 ||  || — || June 18, 2005 || Mount Lemmon || Mount Lemmon Survey ||  || align=right data-sort-value="0.62" | 620 m || 
|-id=503 bgcolor=#fefefe
| 605503 ||  || — || October 22, 2006 || Catalina || CSS ||  || align=right data-sort-value="0.63" | 630 m || 
|-id=504 bgcolor=#fefefe
| 605504 ||  || — || September 30, 2006 || Mount Lemmon || Mount Lemmon Survey ||  || align=right data-sort-value="0.55" | 550 m || 
|-id=505 bgcolor=#E9E9E9
| 605505 ||  || — || July 12, 2016 || Mount Lemmon || Mount Lemmon Survey ||  || align=right data-sort-value="0.65" | 650 m || 
|-id=506 bgcolor=#E9E9E9
| 605506 ||  || — || July 11, 2016 || Haleakala || Pan-STARRS ||  || align=right | 1.5 km || 
|-id=507 bgcolor=#d6d6d6
| 605507 ||  || — || September 21, 2000 || Kitt Peak || R. Millis, R. M. Wagner ||  || align=right | 2.1 km || 
|-id=508 bgcolor=#E9E9E9
| 605508 ||  || — || August 5, 2007 || 7300 || W. K. Y. Yeung ||  || align=right | 2.2 km || 
|-id=509 bgcolor=#fefefe
| 605509 ||  || — || October 14, 2013 || Kitt Peak || Spacewatch ||  || align=right data-sort-value="0.81" | 810 m || 
|-id=510 bgcolor=#d6d6d6
| 605510 ||  || — || January 1, 2008 || Mount Lemmon || Mount Lemmon Survey ||  || align=right | 2.6 km || 
|-id=511 bgcolor=#E9E9E9
| 605511 ||  || — || April 2, 2011 || Kitt Peak || Spacewatch ||  || align=right | 1.0 km || 
|-id=512 bgcolor=#d6d6d6
| 605512 ||  || — || March 2, 2009 || Kitt Peak || Spacewatch ||  || align=right | 2.1 km || 
|-id=513 bgcolor=#E9E9E9
| 605513 ||  || — || February 14, 2002 || Kitt Peak || Spacewatch ||  || align=right | 1.2 km || 
|-id=514 bgcolor=#E9E9E9
| 605514 ||  || — || August 26, 2012 || Haleakala || Pan-STARRS ||  || align=right | 1.1 km || 
|-id=515 bgcolor=#d6d6d6
| 605515 ||  || — || August 6, 2005 || Palomar || NEAT ||  || align=right | 2.2 km || 
|-id=516 bgcolor=#E9E9E9
| 605516 ||  || — || November 20, 2008 || Kitt Peak || Spacewatch ||  || align=right | 1.8 km || 
|-id=517 bgcolor=#fefefe
| 605517 ||  || — || July 5, 2016 || Haleakala || Pan-STARRS ||  || align=right data-sort-value="0.64" | 640 m || 
|-id=518 bgcolor=#E9E9E9
| 605518 ||  || — || July 11, 2016 || Mount Lemmon || Mount Lemmon Survey ||  || align=right | 1.00 km || 
|-id=519 bgcolor=#d6d6d6
| 605519 ||  || — || November 21, 2006 || Desert Moon || B. L. Stevens ||  || align=right | 2.5 km || 
|-id=520 bgcolor=#E9E9E9
| 605520 ||  || — || January 21, 2015 || Haleakala || Pan-STARRS ||  || align=right data-sort-value="0.80" | 800 m || 
|-id=521 bgcolor=#E9E9E9
| 605521 ||  || — || April 1, 2015 || Haleakala || Pan-STARRS ||  || align=right | 1.4 km || 
|-id=522 bgcolor=#d6d6d6
| 605522 ||  || — || September 24, 2011 || Mount Lemmon || Mount Lemmon Survey ||  || align=right | 2.1 km || 
|-id=523 bgcolor=#d6d6d6
| 605523 ||  || — || October 1, 2000 || Kitt Peak || Spacewatch ||  || align=right | 1.8 km || 
|-id=524 bgcolor=#E9E9E9
| 605524 ||  || — || May 21, 2011 || Mount Lemmon || Mount Lemmon Survey ||  || align=right | 1.2 km || 
|-id=525 bgcolor=#fefefe
| 605525 ||  || — || November 1, 2013 || Mount Lemmon || Mount Lemmon Survey ||  || align=right data-sort-value="0.62" | 620 m || 
|-id=526 bgcolor=#fefefe
| 605526 ||  || — || July 11, 2016 || Haleakala || Pan-STARRS ||  || align=right data-sort-value="0.58" | 580 m || 
|-id=527 bgcolor=#d6d6d6
| 605527 ||  || — || July 13, 2016 || Haleakala || Pan-STARRS ||  || align=right | 2.4 km || 
|-id=528 bgcolor=#fefefe
| 605528 ||  || — || July 14, 2016 || Haleakala || Pan-STARRS ||  || align=right data-sort-value="0.79" | 790 m || 
|-id=529 bgcolor=#d6d6d6
| 605529 ||  || — || July 14, 2016 || Mount Lemmon || Mount Lemmon Survey ||  || align=right | 2.5 km || 
|-id=530 bgcolor=#d6d6d6
| 605530 ||  || — || July 5, 2016 || Haleakala || Pan-STARRS ||  || align=right | 2.4 km || 
|-id=531 bgcolor=#fefefe
| 605531 ||  || — || July 14, 2016 || Haleakala || Pan-STARRS ||  || align=right data-sort-value="0.57" | 570 m || 
|-id=532 bgcolor=#E9E9E9
| 605532 ||  || — || July 11, 2016 || Haleakala || Pan-STARRS ||  || align=right | 1.3 km || 
|-id=533 bgcolor=#fefefe
| 605533 ||  || — || August 24, 2001 || Anderson Mesa || LONEOS ||  || align=right | 1.00 km || 
|-id=534 bgcolor=#E9E9E9
| 605534 ||  || — || November 7, 2008 || Mount Lemmon || Mount Lemmon Survey ||  || align=right | 1.1 km || 
|-id=535 bgcolor=#E9E9E9
| 605535 ||  || — || November 8, 2008 || Mount Lemmon || Mount Lemmon Survey ||  || align=right | 1.2 km || 
|-id=536 bgcolor=#E9E9E9
| 605536 ||  || — || January 18, 2004 || Catalina || CSS ||  || align=right | 2.3 km || 
|-id=537 bgcolor=#E9E9E9
| 605537 ||  || — || September 24, 2008 || Catalina || CSS ||  || align=right | 1.0 km || 
|-id=538 bgcolor=#E9E9E9
| 605538 ||  || — || June 6, 2011 || Haleakala || Pan-STARRS ||  || align=right | 1.6 km || 
|-id=539 bgcolor=#E9E9E9
| 605539 ||  || — || January 18, 2015 || Haleakala || Pan-STARRS ||  || align=right data-sort-value="0.94" | 940 m || 
|-id=540 bgcolor=#fefefe
| 605540 ||  || — || November 9, 2013 || Mount Lemmon || Mount Lemmon Survey ||  || align=right data-sort-value="0.62" | 620 m || 
|-id=541 bgcolor=#E9E9E9
| 605541 ||  || — || October 23, 2008 || Kitt Peak || Spacewatch ||  || align=right | 1.1 km || 
|-id=542 bgcolor=#fefefe
| 605542 ||  || — || October 12, 2013 || Kitt Peak || Spacewatch ||  || align=right data-sort-value="0.65" | 650 m || 
|-id=543 bgcolor=#d6d6d6
| 605543 ||  || — || October 29, 2011 || Haleakala || Pan-STARRS ||  || align=right | 2.5 km || 
|-id=544 bgcolor=#fefefe
| 605544 ||  || — || November 26, 2013 || Mount Lemmon || Mount Lemmon Survey ||  || align=right data-sort-value="0.58" | 580 m || 
|-id=545 bgcolor=#E9E9E9
| 605545 ||  || — || April 25, 2015 || Haleakala || Pan-STARRS ||  || align=right | 1.2 km || 
|-id=546 bgcolor=#d6d6d6
| 605546 ||  || — || May 19, 2005 || Mount Lemmon || Mount Lemmon Survey ||  || align=right | 4.2 km || 
|-id=547 bgcolor=#E9E9E9
| 605547 ||  || — || May 12, 2007 || Kitt Peak || Spacewatch ||  || align=right | 1.2 km || 
|-id=548 bgcolor=#E9E9E9
| 605548 ||  || — || August 7, 2016 || Haleakala || Pan-STARRS ||  || align=right data-sort-value="0.82" | 820 m || 
|-id=549 bgcolor=#E9E9E9
| 605549 ||  || — || October 31, 2008 || Catalina || CSS ||  || align=right | 1.4 km || 
|-id=550 bgcolor=#E9E9E9
| 605550 ||  || — || April 24, 2015 || Haleakala || Pan-STARRS ||  || align=right | 1.6 km || 
|-id=551 bgcolor=#fefefe
| 605551 ||  || — || September 21, 2000 || Kitt Peak || R. Millis, R. M. Wagner ||  || align=right data-sort-value="0.40" | 400 m || 
|-id=552 bgcolor=#fefefe
| 605552 ||  || — || January 17, 2015 || Haleakala || Pan-STARRS ||  || align=right data-sort-value="0.68" | 680 m || 
|-id=553 bgcolor=#fefefe
| 605553 ||  || — || September 28, 2009 || Mount Lemmon || Mount Lemmon Survey ||  || align=right data-sort-value="0.64" | 640 m || 
|-id=554 bgcolor=#d6d6d6
| 605554 ||  || — || August 7, 2016 || Haleakala || Pan-STARRS ||  || align=right | 2.5 km || 
|-id=555 bgcolor=#d6d6d6
| 605555 ||  || — || July 26, 2016 || Kitt Peak || Spacewatch ||  || align=right | 2.3 km || 
|-id=556 bgcolor=#d6d6d6
| 605556 ||  || — || April 23, 2015 || Haleakala || Pan-STARRS ||  || align=right | 2.1 km || 
|-id=557 bgcolor=#E9E9E9
| 605557 ||  || — || January 24, 2014 || Haleakala || Pan-STARRS ||  || align=right | 1.4 km || 
|-id=558 bgcolor=#d6d6d6
| 605558 ||  || — || November 14, 2007 || Kitt Peak || Spacewatch ||  || align=right | 2.1 km || 
|-id=559 bgcolor=#d6d6d6
| 605559 ||  || — || May 24, 2015 || Mount Lemmon || Mount Lemmon Survey ||  || align=right | 2.6 km || 
|-id=560 bgcolor=#fefefe
| 605560 ||  || — || July 8, 2016 || Haleakala || Pan-STARRS ||  || align=right data-sort-value="0.73" | 730 m || 
|-id=561 bgcolor=#E9E9E9
| 605561 ||  || — || October 31, 2008 || Kitt Peak || Spacewatch ||  || align=right | 1.2 km || 
|-id=562 bgcolor=#E9E9E9
| 605562 ||  || — || February 24, 2014 || Haleakala || Pan-STARRS ||  || align=right | 1.8 km || 
|-id=563 bgcolor=#E9E9E9
| 605563 ||  || — || April 25, 2015 || Haleakala || Pan-STARRS ||  || align=right | 1.2 km || 
|-id=564 bgcolor=#E9E9E9
| 605564 ||  || — || August 9, 2016 || Haleakala || Pan-STARRS ||  || align=right data-sort-value="0.92" | 920 m || 
|-id=565 bgcolor=#E9E9E9
| 605565 ||  || — || August 9, 2016 || Haleakala || Pan-STARRS ||  || align=right data-sort-value="0.99" | 990 m || 
|-id=566 bgcolor=#E9E9E9
| 605566 ||  || — || March 27, 2015 || Haleakala || Pan-STARRS ||  || align=right | 1.1 km || 
|-id=567 bgcolor=#fefefe
| 605567 ||  || — || August 5, 2002 || Palomar || NEAT ||  || align=right data-sort-value="0.81" | 810 m || 
|-id=568 bgcolor=#E9E9E9
| 605568 ||  || — || August 22, 2003 || Palomar || NEAT ||  || align=right | 1.3 km || 
|-id=569 bgcolor=#d6d6d6
| 605569 ||  || — || July 31, 2005 || Palomar || NEAT ||  || align=right | 3.7 km || 
|-id=570 bgcolor=#E9E9E9
| 605570 ||  || — || September 13, 2007 || Mount Lemmon || Mount Lemmon Survey ||  || align=right | 1.3 km || 
|-id=571 bgcolor=#E9E9E9
| 605571 ||  || — || July 9, 2015 || Haleakala || Pan-STARRS ||  || align=right | 1.5 km || 
|-id=572 bgcolor=#E9E9E9
| 605572 ||  || — || January 2, 2009 || Mount Lemmon || Mount Lemmon Survey ||  || align=right | 1.4 km || 
|-id=573 bgcolor=#fefefe
| 605573 ||  || — || February 8, 2011 || Mount Lemmon || Mount Lemmon Survey ||  || align=right data-sort-value="0.59" | 590 m || 
|-id=574 bgcolor=#E9E9E9
| 605574 ||  || — || October 26, 2012 || Mount Lemmon || Mount Lemmon Survey ||  || align=right | 1.4 km || 
|-id=575 bgcolor=#E9E9E9
| 605575 ||  || — || September 21, 2003 || Kitt Peak || Spacewatch ||  || align=right | 1.8 km || 
|-id=576 bgcolor=#E9E9E9
| 605576 ||  || — || September 22, 2003 || Kitt Peak || Spacewatch ||  || align=right | 1.3 km || 
|-id=577 bgcolor=#E9E9E9
| 605577 ||  || — || March 5, 2006 || Kitt Peak || Spacewatch ||  || align=right | 1.0 km || 
|-id=578 bgcolor=#E9E9E9
| 605578 ||  || — || August 1, 2016 || Haleakala || Pan-STARRS ||  || align=right | 1.8 km || 
|-id=579 bgcolor=#E9E9E9
| 605579 ||  || — || January 1, 2014 || Haleakala || Pan-STARRS ||  || align=right data-sort-value="0.73" | 730 m || 
|-id=580 bgcolor=#E9E9E9
| 605580 ||  || — || September 15, 2004 || Kitt Peak || Spacewatch ||  || align=right data-sort-value="0.75" | 750 m || 
|-id=581 bgcolor=#E9E9E9
| 605581 ||  || — || April 25, 2015 || Haleakala || Pan-STARRS ||  || align=right | 1.6 km || 
|-id=582 bgcolor=#E9E9E9
| 605582 ||  || — || August 2, 2016 || Haleakala || Pan-STARRS ||  || align=right | 2.1 km || 
|-id=583 bgcolor=#d6d6d6
| 605583 ||  || — || April 23, 2015 || Haleakala || Pan-STARRS 2 ||  || align=right | 2.2 km || 
|-id=584 bgcolor=#E9E9E9
| 605584 ||  || — || September 19, 1998 || Apache Point || SDSS Collaboration ||  || align=right | 1.5 km || 
|-id=585 bgcolor=#E9E9E9
| 605585 ||  || — || September 9, 2008 || Mount Lemmon || Mount Lemmon Survey ||  || align=right | 1.2 km || 
|-id=586 bgcolor=#E9E9E9
| 605586 ||  || — || October 18, 2012 || Haleakala || Pan-STARRS ||  || align=right | 1.8 km || 
|-id=587 bgcolor=#E9E9E9
| 605587 ||  || — || May 18, 2015 || Haleakala || Pan-STARRS ||  || align=right | 1.5 km || 
|-id=588 bgcolor=#d6d6d6
| 605588 ||  || — || February 26, 2004 || Kitt Peak || M. W. Buie, D. E. Trilling ||  || align=right | 2.1 km || 
|-id=589 bgcolor=#E9E9E9
| 605589 ||  || — || August 2, 2016 || Haleakala || Pan-STARRS ||  || align=right | 1.5 km || 
|-id=590 bgcolor=#E9E9E9
| 605590 ||  || — || August 10, 2016 || Haleakala || Pan-STARRS ||  || align=right | 1.0 km || 
|-id=591 bgcolor=#fefefe
| 605591 ||  || — || August 15, 2009 || Kitt Peak || Spacewatch ||  || align=right data-sort-value="0.53" | 530 m || 
|-id=592 bgcolor=#fefefe
| 605592 ||  || — || August 14, 2016 || Haleakala || Pan-STARRS ||  || align=right data-sort-value="0.62" | 620 m || 
|-id=593 bgcolor=#d6d6d6
| 605593 ||  || — || August 2, 2016 || Haleakala || Pan-STARRS ||  || align=right | 1.8 km || 
|-id=594 bgcolor=#fefefe
| 605594 ||  || — || August 2, 2016 || Haleakala || Pan-STARRS ||  || align=right data-sort-value="0.71" | 710 m || 
|-id=595 bgcolor=#fefefe
| 605595 ||  || — || August 3, 2016 || Haleakala || Pan-STARRS ||  || align=right data-sort-value="0.72" | 720 m || 
|-id=596 bgcolor=#fefefe
| 605596 ||  || — || August 3, 2016 || Haleakala || Pan-STARRS ||  || align=right data-sort-value="0.60" | 600 m || 
|-id=597 bgcolor=#d6d6d6
| 605597 ||  || — || September 11, 2010 || Mount Lemmon || Mount Lemmon Survey ||  || align=right | 2.8 km || 
|-id=598 bgcolor=#fefefe
| 605598 ||  || — || September 30, 2006 || Mount Lemmon || Mount Lemmon Survey ||  || align=right data-sort-value="0.88" | 880 m || 
|-id=599 bgcolor=#E9E9E9
| 605599 ||  || — || March 2, 2011 || Kitt Peak || Spacewatch ||  || align=right | 1.4 km || 
|-id=600 bgcolor=#E9E9E9
| 605600 ||  || — || December 30, 2013 || Haleakala || Pan-STARRS ||  || align=right | 1.2 km || 
|}

605601–605700 

|-bgcolor=#fefefe
| 605601 ||  || — || January 23, 2011 || Mount Lemmon || Mount Lemmon Survey ||  || align=right data-sort-value="0.67" | 670 m || 
|-id=602 bgcolor=#E9E9E9
| 605602 ||  || — || July 6, 2016 || Haleakala || Pan-STARRS ||  || align=right | 2.3 km || 
|-id=603 bgcolor=#fefefe
| 605603 ||  || — || February 17, 2007 || Mount Lemmon || Mount Lemmon Survey ||  || align=right data-sort-value="0.96" | 960 m || 
|-id=604 bgcolor=#E9E9E9
| 605604 ||  || — || February 9, 2005 || Kitt Peak || Spacewatch ||  || align=right | 1.7 km || 
|-id=605 bgcolor=#E9E9E9
| 605605 ||  || — || January 23, 2014 || Mount Lemmon || Mount Lemmon Survey ||  || align=right | 1.7 km || 
|-id=606 bgcolor=#fefefe
| 605606 ||  || — || December 3, 2013 || Mount Lemmon || Mount Lemmon Survey ||  || align=right data-sort-value="0.63" | 630 m || 
|-id=607 bgcolor=#E9E9E9
| 605607 ||  || — || November 7, 2008 || Mount Lemmon || Mount Lemmon Survey ||  || align=right | 1.4 km || 
|-id=608 bgcolor=#E9E9E9
| 605608 ||  || — || February 14, 2010 || Kitt Peak || Spacewatch ||  || align=right | 1.4 km || 
|-id=609 bgcolor=#E9E9E9
| 605609 ||  || — || March 5, 2006 || Mount Lemmon || Mount Lemmon Survey ||  || align=right | 1.3 km || 
|-id=610 bgcolor=#fefefe
| 605610 ||  || — || July 5, 2005 || Kitt Peak || Spacewatch ||  || align=right data-sort-value="0.65" | 650 m || 
|-id=611 bgcolor=#E9E9E9
| 605611 ||  || — || September 28, 2003 || Kitt Peak || Spacewatch ||  || align=right | 1.8 km || 
|-id=612 bgcolor=#E9E9E9
| 605612 ||  || — || January 23, 2015 || Haleakala || Pan-STARRS ||  || align=right | 1.9 km || 
|-id=613 bgcolor=#E9E9E9
| 605613 ||  || — || September 19, 2007 || Kitt Peak || Spacewatch ||  || align=right | 1.8 km || 
|-id=614 bgcolor=#E9E9E9
| 605614 ||  || — || September 6, 2008 || Mount Lemmon || Mount Lemmon Survey ||  || align=right data-sort-value="0.67" | 670 m || 
|-id=615 bgcolor=#E9E9E9
| 605615 ||  || — || September 9, 2007 || Kitt Peak || Spacewatch ||  || align=right | 2.2 km || 
|-id=616 bgcolor=#fefefe
| 605616 ||  || — || May 28, 2009 || Mount Lemmon || Mount Lemmon Survey ||  || align=right data-sort-value="0.73" | 730 m || 
|-id=617 bgcolor=#E9E9E9
| 605617 ||  || — || May 24, 2011 || Nogales || M. Schwartz, P. R. Holvorcem ||  || align=right | 2.3 km || 
|-id=618 bgcolor=#E9E9E9
| 605618 ||  || — || February 4, 2006 || Mount Lemmon || Mount Lemmon Survey ||  || align=right | 1.2 km || 
|-id=619 bgcolor=#E9E9E9
| 605619 ||  || — || June 4, 2011 || Mount Lemmon || Mount Lemmon Survey ||  || align=right | 1.5 km || 
|-id=620 bgcolor=#E9E9E9
| 605620 ||  || — || January 25, 2015 || Haleakala || Pan-STARRS ||  || align=right | 1.4 km || 
|-id=621 bgcolor=#d6d6d6
| 605621 ||  || — || February 26, 2008 || Mount Lemmon || Mount Lemmon Survey ||  || align=right | 3.2 km || 
|-id=622 bgcolor=#E9E9E9
| 605622 ||  || — || August 3, 2016 || Haleakala || Pan-STARRS ||  || align=right data-sort-value="0.81" | 810 m || 
|-id=623 bgcolor=#fefefe
| 605623 ||  || — || March 5, 2008 || Mount Lemmon || Mount Lemmon Survey ||  || align=right data-sort-value="0.82" | 820 m || 
|-id=624 bgcolor=#fefefe
| 605624 ||  || — || June 1, 2008 || Mount Lemmon || Mount Lemmon Survey ||  || align=right data-sort-value="0.84" | 840 m || 
|-id=625 bgcolor=#E9E9E9
| 605625 ||  || — || September 30, 2003 || Kitt Peak || Spacewatch ||  || align=right | 1.9 km || 
|-id=626 bgcolor=#E9E9E9
| 605626 ||  || — || September 13, 2007 || Mount Lemmon || Mount Lemmon Survey ||  || align=right | 2.9 km || 
|-id=627 bgcolor=#E9E9E9
| 605627 ||  || — || October 20, 2012 || Haleakala || Pan-STARRS ||  || align=right | 1.3 km || 
|-id=628 bgcolor=#fefefe
| 605628 ||  || — || March 16, 2004 || Campo Imperatore || CINEOS ||  || align=right data-sort-value="0.67" | 670 m || 
|-id=629 bgcolor=#fefefe
| 605629 ||  || — || November 27, 2013 || Haleakala || Pan-STARRS ||  || align=right data-sort-value="0.64" | 640 m || 
|-id=630 bgcolor=#fefefe
| 605630 ||  || — || July 14, 2016 || Haleakala || Pan-STARRS ||  || align=right data-sort-value="0.73" | 730 m || 
|-id=631 bgcolor=#E9E9E9
| 605631 ||  || — || September 20, 2003 || Kitt Peak || Spacewatch ||  || align=right | 1.6 km || 
|-id=632 bgcolor=#E9E9E9
| 605632 ||  || — || May 30, 2011 || Haleakala || Pan-STARRS ||  || align=right | 1.8 km || 
|-id=633 bgcolor=#E9E9E9
| 605633 ||  || — || September 6, 2008 || Kitt Peak || Spacewatch ||  || align=right data-sort-value="0.95" | 950 m || 
|-id=634 bgcolor=#d6d6d6
| 605634 ||  || — || September 20, 2011 || Kitt Peak || Spacewatch ||  || align=right | 2.4 km || 
|-id=635 bgcolor=#d6d6d6
| 605635 ||  || — || June 13, 2015 || Haleakala || Pan-STARRS || 7:4 || align=right | 2.4 km || 
|-id=636 bgcolor=#E9E9E9
| 605636 ||  || — || September 10, 2007 || Mount Lemmon || Mount Lemmon Survey ||  || align=right | 1.8 km || 
|-id=637 bgcolor=#d6d6d6
| 605637 ||  || — || October 5, 2011 || Les Engarouines || L. Bernasconi ||  || align=right | 2.6 km || 
|-id=638 bgcolor=#E9E9E9
| 605638 ||  || — || September 3, 2008 || Kitt Peak || Spacewatch ||  || align=right | 1.4 km || 
|-id=639 bgcolor=#fefefe
| 605639 ||  || — || May 28, 2012 || Mount Lemmon || Mount Lemmon Survey ||  || align=right data-sort-value="0.99" | 990 m || 
|-id=640 bgcolor=#E9E9E9
| 605640 ||  || — || August 26, 2012 || Haleakala || Pan-STARRS ||  || align=right | 1.4 km || 
|-id=641 bgcolor=#E9E9E9
| 605641 ||  || — || October 24, 2008 || Kitt Peak || Spacewatch ||  || align=right | 1.6 km || 
|-id=642 bgcolor=#fefefe
| 605642 ||  || — || May 8, 2008 || Mount Lemmon || Mount Lemmon Survey ||  || align=right data-sort-value="0.54" | 540 m || 
|-id=643 bgcolor=#E9E9E9
| 605643 ||  || — || October 8, 2012 || Mount Lemmon || Mount Lemmon Survey ||  || align=right | 1.3 km || 
|-id=644 bgcolor=#fefefe
| 605644 ||  || — || October 26, 2013 || Mount Lemmon || Mount Lemmon Survey ||  || align=right data-sort-value="0.53" | 530 m || 
|-id=645 bgcolor=#fefefe
| 605645 ||  || — || June 8, 2005 || Kitt Peak || Spacewatch ||  || align=right data-sort-value="0.60" | 600 m || 
|-id=646 bgcolor=#fefefe
| 605646 ||  || — || November 21, 2009 || Kitt Peak || Spacewatch ||  || align=right data-sort-value="0.79" | 790 m || 
|-id=647 bgcolor=#E9E9E9
| 605647 ||  || — || September 16, 2012 || Catalina || CSS ||  || align=right | 1.3 km || 
|-id=648 bgcolor=#E9E9E9
| 605648 ||  || — || June 4, 2003 || Kitt Peak || Spacewatch ||  || align=right | 2.1 km || 
|-id=649 bgcolor=#d6d6d6
| 605649 ||  || — || October 4, 2011 || Piszkesteto || K. Sárneczky ||  || align=right | 3.5 km || 
|-id=650 bgcolor=#E9E9E9
| 605650 ||  || — || July 7, 2016 || Mount Lemmon || Mount Lemmon Survey ||  || align=right data-sort-value="0.81" | 810 m || 
|-id=651 bgcolor=#E9E9E9
| 605651 ||  || — || April 18, 2015 || Kitt Peak || Spacewatch ||  || align=right data-sort-value="0.88" | 880 m || 
|-id=652 bgcolor=#E9E9E9
| 605652 ||  || — || July 30, 2016 || Haleakala || Pan-STARRS ||  || align=right data-sort-value="0.98" | 980 m || 
|-id=653 bgcolor=#E9E9E9
| 605653 ||  || — || December 3, 2012 || Mount Lemmon || Mount Lemmon Survey ||  || align=right | 1.8 km || 
|-id=654 bgcolor=#E9E9E9
| 605654 ||  || — || September 9, 2007 || Kitt Peak || Spacewatch ||  || align=right | 2.0 km || 
|-id=655 bgcolor=#E9E9E9
| 605655 ||  || — || May 21, 2015 || Haleakala || Pan-STARRS ||  || align=right | 1.3 km || 
|-id=656 bgcolor=#E9E9E9
| 605656 ||  || — || August 30, 2016 || Haleakala || Pan-STARRS ||  || align=right data-sort-value="0.60" | 600 m || 
|-id=657 bgcolor=#E9E9E9
| 605657 ||  || — || May 22, 2015 || Haleakala || Pan-STARRS ||  || align=right | 1.1 km || 
|-id=658 bgcolor=#E9E9E9
| 605658 ||  || — || August 30, 2016 || Mount Lemmon || Mount Lemmon Survey ||  || align=right | 1.3 km || 
|-id=659 bgcolor=#E9E9E9
| 605659 ||  || — || August 29, 2016 || Mount Lemmon || Mount Lemmon Survey ||  || align=right | 2.0 km || 
|-id=660 bgcolor=#E9E9E9
| 605660 ||  || — || August 27, 2016 || Haleakala || Pan-STARRS ||  || align=right | 1.3 km || 
|-id=661 bgcolor=#d6d6d6
| 605661 ||  || — || August 26, 2016 || Haleakala || Pan-STARRS ||  || align=right | 2.3 km || 
|-id=662 bgcolor=#FA8072
| 605662 ||  || — || August 17, 2016 || Haleakala || Pan-STARRS ||  || align=right data-sort-value="0.68" | 680 m || 
|-id=663 bgcolor=#d6d6d6
| 605663 ||  || — || August 28, 2016 || Mount Lemmon || Mount Lemmon Survey ||  || align=right | 1.7 km || 
|-id=664 bgcolor=#E9E9E9
| 605664 ||  || — || June 7, 2011 || Mount Lemmon || Mount Lemmon Survey ||  || align=right | 1.2 km || 
|-id=665 bgcolor=#fefefe
| 605665 ||  || — || March 14, 2011 || Mount Lemmon || Mount Lemmon Survey ||  || align=right | 1.0 km || 
|-id=666 bgcolor=#E9E9E9
| 605666 ||  || — || March 4, 2005 || Kitt Peak || Spacewatch ||  || align=right | 1.6 km || 
|-id=667 bgcolor=#fefefe
| 605667 ||  || — || September 21, 2009 || Kitt Peak || Spacewatch ||  || align=right data-sort-value="0.70" | 700 m || 
|-id=668 bgcolor=#fefefe
| 605668 ||  || — || September 17, 2003 || Kitt Peak || Spacewatch ||  || align=right data-sort-value="0.52" | 520 m || 
|-id=669 bgcolor=#E9E9E9
| 605669 ||  || — || January 28, 2015 || Haleakala || Pan-STARRS ||  || align=right | 1.2 km || 
|-id=670 bgcolor=#d6d6d6
| 605670 ||  || — || February 9, 2014 || Haleakala || Pan-STARRS ||  || align=right | 2.4 km || 
|-id=671 bgcolor=#d6d6d6
| 605671 ||  || — || September 30, 2011 || Kitt Peak || Spacewatch ||  || align=right | 3.3 km || 
|-id=672 bgcolor=#fefefe
| 605672 ||  || — || January 15, 2015 || Haleakala || Pan-STARRS || H || align=right data-sort-value="0.44" | 440 m || 
|-id=673 bgcolor=#fefefe
| 605673 ||  || — || June 4, 2013 || Mount Lemmon || Mount Lemmon Survey || H || align=right data-sort-value="0.61" | 610 m || 
|-id=674 bgcolor=#E9E9E9
| 605674 ||  || — || May 9, 2006 || Mount Lemmon || Mount Lemmon Survey ||  || align=right | 1.9 km || 
|-id=675 bgcolor=#E9E9E9
| 605675 ||  || — || April 12, 2015 || Haleakala || Pan-STARRS ||  || align=right | 1.6 km || 
|-id=676 bgcolor=#fefefe
| 605676 ||  || — || April 1, 2008 || Mount Lemmon || Mount Lemmon Survey ||  || align=right data-sort-value="0.80" | 800 m || 
|-id=677 bgcolor=#E9E9E9
| 605677 ||  || — || September 9, 2016 || Mount Lemmon || Mount Lemmon Survey ||  || align=right | 2.5 km || 
|-id=678 bgcolor=#E9E9E9
| 605678 ||  || — || September 18, 2003 || Kitt Peak || Spacewatch ||  || align=right | 1.2 km || 
|-id=679 bgcolor=#E9E9E9
| 605679 ||  || — || October 10, 2007 || Kitt Peak || Spacewatch ||  || align=right | 1.9 km || 
|-id=680 bgcolor=#E9E9E9
| 605680 ||  || — || September 4, 2003 || Kitt Peak || Spacewatch ||  || align=right | 1.2 km || 
|-id=681 bgcolor=#d6d6d6
| 605681 ||  || — || February 14, 2013 || Catalina || CSS ||  || align=right | 3.3 km || 
|-id=682 bgcolor=#fefefe
| 605682 ||  || — || November 24, 2003 || Kitt Peak || Spacewatch ||  || align=right data-sort-value="0.50" | 500 m || 
|-id=683 bgcolor=#E9E9E9
| 605683 ||  || — || January 23, 2015 || Haleakala || Pan-STARRS ||  || align=right | 1.5 km || 
|-id=684 bgcolor=#E9E9E9
| 605684 ||  || — || April 23, 2011 || Kitt Peak || Spacewatch ||  || align=right data-sort-value="0.92" | 920 m || 
|-id=685 bgcolor=#E9E9E9
| 605685 ||  || — || September 2, 2016 || Mount Lemmon || Mount Lemmon Survey ||  || align=right | 1.3 km || 
|-id=686 bgcolor=#fefefe
| 605686 ||  || — || September 12, 2016 || Mount Lemmon || Mount Lemmon Survey ||  || align=right data-sort-value="0.80" | 800 m || 
|-id=687 bgcolor=#E9E9E9
| 605687 ||  || — || September 8, 2016 || Haleakala || Pan-STARRS ||  || align=right data-sort-value="0.80" | 800 m || 
|-id=688 bgcolor=#E9E9E9
| 605688 ||  || — || October 19, 2012 || Mount Lemmon || Mount Lemmon Survey ||  || align=right | 1.9 km || 
|-id=689 bgcolor=#E9E9E9
| 605689 ||  || — || September 2, 2016 || Mount Lemmon || Mount Lemmon Survey ||  || align=right | 1.8 km || 
|-id=690 bgcolor=#fefefe
| 605690 ||  || — || August 26, 2012 || Haleakala || Pan-STARRS ||  || align=right data-sort-value="0.60" | 600 m || 
|-id=691 bgcolor=#E9E9E9
| 605691 ||  || — || September 10, 2016 || Mount Lemmon || Mount Lemmon Survey ||  || align=right | 1.7 km || 
|-id=692 bgcolor=#E9E9E9
| 605692 ||  || — || August 30, 2016 || Haleakala || Pan-STARRS ||  || align=right | 2.1 km || 
|-id=693 bgcolor=#E9E9E9
| 605693 ||  || — || September 13, 2007 || Catalina || CSS ||  || align=right | 2.2 km || 
|-id=694 bgcolor=#E9E9E9
| 605694 ||  || — || October 14, 2012 || Kitt Peak || Spacewatch ||  || align=right | 1.5 km || 
|-id=695 bgcolor=#E9E9E9
| 605695 ||  || — || September 12, 2002 || Palomar || NEAT ||  || align=right | 2.2 km || 
|-id=696 bgcolor=#E9E9E9
| 605696 ||  || — || September 21, 2012 || Kitt Peak || Spacewatch ||  || align=right | 1.00 km || 
|-id=697 bgcolor=#fefefe
| 605697 ||  || — || March 29, 2012 || Mount Lemmon || Mount Lemmon Survey ||  || align=right data-sort-value="0.63" | 630 m || 
|-id=698 bgcolor=#E9E9E9
| 605698 ||  || — || March 16, 2015 || Kitt Peak || Spacewatch ||  || align=right | 1.1 km || 
|-id=699 bgcolor=#E9E9E9
| 605699 ||  || — || July 25, 2011 || Haleakala || Pan-STARRS ||  || align=right | 1.6 km || 
|-id=700 bgcolor=#E9E9E9
| 605700 ||  || — || August 19, 2002 || Palomar || NEAT ||  || align=right | 3.4 km || 
|}

605701–605800 

|-bgcolor=#E9E9E9
| 605701 ||  || — || November 18, 2003 || Kitt Peak || Spacewatch ||  || align=right | 1.1 km || 
|-id=702 bgcolor=#fefefe
| 605702 ||  || — || September 30, 2005 || Mount Lemmon || Mount Lemmon Survey ||  || align=right data-sort-value="0.61" | 610 m || 
|-id=703 bgcolor=#E9E9E9
| 605703 ||  || — || February 20, 2006 || Kitt Peak || Spacewatch ||  || align=right | 1.2 km || 
|-id=704 bgcolor=#fefefe
| 605704 ||  || — || August 3, 2016 || Haleakala || Pan-STARRS ||  || align=right data-sort-value="0.67" | 670 m || 
|-id=705 bgcolor=#E9E9E9
| 605705 ||  || — || June 3, 2011 || Mount Lemmon || Mount Lemmon Survey ||  || align=right | 1.3 km || 
|-id=706 bgcolor=#fefefe
| 605706 ||  || — || May 27, 2012 || Mount Lemmon || Mount Lemmon Survey ||  || align=right data-sort-value="0.57" | 570 m || 
|-id=707 bgcolor=#E9E9E9
| 605707 ||  || — || May 12, 2015 || Mount Lemmon || Mount Lemmon Survey ||  || align=right | 1.3 km || 
|-id=708 bgcolor=#d6d6d6
| 605708 ||  || — || September 25, 2011 || Haleakala || Pan-STARRS ||  || align=right | 2.0 km || 
|-id=709 bgcolor=#FA8072
| 605709 ||  || — || October 17, 2012 || Haleakala || Pan-STARRS ||  || align=right data-sort-value="0.97" | 970 m || 
|-id=710 bgcolor=#d6d6d6
| 605710 ||  || — || June 2, 2005 || Mount Lemmon || Mount Lemmon Survey ||  || align=right | 2.7 km || 
|-id=711 bgcolor=#fefefe
| 605711 ||  || — || July 30, 2016 || Haleakala || Pan-STARRS ||  || align=right data-sort-value="0.85" | 850 m || 
|-id=712 bgcolor=#d6d6d6
| 605712 ||  || — || November 9, 2007 || Kitt Peak || Spacewatch ||  || align=right | 2.1 km || 
|-id=713 bgcolor=#E9E9E9
| 605713 ||  || — || March 20, 2010 || Mount Lemmon || Mount Lemmon Survey ||  || align=right | 1.2 km || 
|-id=714 bgcolor=#E9E9E9
| 605714 ||  || — || February 28, 2014 || Haleakala || Pan-STARRS ||  || align=right | 1.2 km || 
|-id=715 bgcolor=#fefefe
| 605715 ||  || — || June 30, 2005 || Kitt Peak || Spacewatch ||  || align=right data-sort-value="0.72" | 720 m || 
|-id=716 bgcolor=#E9E9E9
| 605716 ||  || — || January 31, 2009 || Mount Lemmon || Mount Lemmon Survey ||  || align=right | 2.0 km || 
|-id=717 bgcolor=#E9E9E9
| 605717 ||  || — || October 10, 2007 || Kitt Peak || Spacewatch ||  || align=right | 2.1 km || 
|-id=718 bgcolor=#E9E9E9
| 605718 ||  || — || October 31, 2005 || Mauna Kea || Mauna Kea Obs. ||  || align=right | 1.2 km || 
|-id=719 bgcolor=#d6d6d6
| 605719 ||  || — || September 30, 2016 || Haleakala || Pan-STARRS ||  || align=right | 2.0 km || 
|-id=720 bgcolor=#fefefe
| 605720 ||  || — || March 12, 2011 || Mount Lemmon || Mount Lemmon Survey ||  || align=right data-sort-value="0.67" | 670 m || 
|-id=721 bgcolor=#d6d6d6
| 605721 ||  || — || September 27, 2016 || Haleakala || Pan-STARRS ||  || align=right | 2.3 km || 
|-id=722 bgcolor=#d6d6d6
| 605722 ||  || — || September 27, 2016 || Mount Lemmon || Mount Lemmon Survey ||  || align=right | 1.8 km || 
|-id=723 bgcolor=#E9E9E9
| 605723 ||  || — || September 27, 2016 || Haleakala || Pan-STARRS ||  || align=right | 1.6 km || 
|-id=724 bgcolor=#E9E9E9
| 605724 ||  || — || September 27, 2016 || Mount Lemmon || Mount Lemmon Survey ||  || align=right data-sort-value="0.93" | 930 m || 
|-id=725 bgcolor=#fefefe
| 605725 ||  || — || September 26, 2016 || Haleakala || Pan-STARRS ||  || align=right data-sort-value="0.64" | 640 m || 
|-id=726 bgcolor=#d6d6d6
| 605726 ||  || — || September 25, 2016 || Haleakala || Pan-STARRS ||  || align=right | 1.8 km || 
|-id=727 bgcolor=#E9E9E9
| 605727 ||  || — || September 27, 2016 || Mount Lemmon || Mount Lemmon Survey ||  || align=right | 1.2 km || 
|-id=728 bgcolor=#E9E9E9
| 605728 ||  || — || September 27, 2016 || Haleakala || Pan-STARRS ||  || align=right | 1.7 km || 
|-id=729 bgcolor=#E9E9E9
| 605729 ||  || — || September 26, 2016 || Haleakala || Pan-STARRS ||  || align=right | 1.0 km || 
|-id=730 bgcolor=#d6d6d6
| 605730 ||  || — || September 25, 2016 || Haleakala || Pan-STARRS ||  || align=right | 2.2 km || 
|-id=731 bgcolor=#d6d6d6
| 605731 ||  || — || September 26, 2016 || Haleakala || Pan-STARRS ||  || align=right | 1.8 km || 
|-id=732 bgcolor=#E9E9E9
| 605732 ||  || — || February 25, 2014 || Kitt Peak || Spacewatch ||  || align=right data-sort-value="0.97" | 970 m || 
|-id=733 bgcolor=#d6d6d6
| 605733 ||  || — || December 4, 2007 || Mount Lemmon || Mount Lemmon Survey ||  || align=right | 1.9 km || 
|-id=734 bgcolor=#E9E9E9
| 605734 ||  || — || September 19, 2003 || Kitt Peak || Spacewatch ||  || align=right | 1.4 km || 
|-id=735 bgcolor=#E9E9E9
| 605735 ||  || — || August 3, 2016 || Haleakala || Pan-STARRS ||  || align=right | 1.6 km || 
|-id=736 bgcolor=#E9E9E9
| 605736 ||  || — || May 15, 2015 || Haleakala || Pan-STARRS ||  || align=right | 1.0 km || 
|-id=737 bgcolor=#E9E9E9
| 605737 ||  || — || October 14, 2007 || Kitt Peak || Spacewatch ||  || align=right | 2.1 km || 
|-id=738 bgcolor=#E9E9E9
| 605738 ||  || — || October 20, 2012 || Haleakala || Pan-STARRS ||  || align=right data-sort-value="0.77" | 770 m || 
|-id=739 bgcolor=#fefefe
| 605739 ||  || — || December 20, 2014 || Haleakala || Pan-STARRS || H || align=right data-sort-value="0.52" | 520 m || 
|-id=740 bgcolor=#fefefe
| 605740 ||  || — || September 14, 2012 || La Sagra || OAM Obs. ||  || align=right data-sort-value="0.92" | 920 m || 
|-id=741 bgcolor=#E9E9E9
| 605741 ||  || — || October 20, 2004 || Catalina || CSS ||  || align=right | 1.2 km || 
|-id=742 bgcolor=#E9E9E9
| 605742 ||  || — || October 14, 2012 || ASC-Kislovodsk || V. Nevski, O. Zeloyniy ||  || align=right | 1.0 km || 
|-id=743 bgcolor=#FA8072
| 605743 ||  || — || October 1, 2011 || Mount Lemmon || Mount Lemmon Survey || H || align=right data-sort-value="0.43" | 430 m || 
|-id=744 bgcolor=#E9E9E9
| 605744 ||  || — || October 22, 2003 || Kitt Peak || Spacewatch ||  || align=right | 1.4 km || 
|-id=745 bgcolor=#E9E9E9
| 605745 ||  || — || November 26, 2012 || Mount Lemmon || Mount Lemmon Survey ||  || align=right | 1.7 km || 
|-id=746 bgcolor=#E9E9E9
| 605746 ||  || — || October 10, 2012 || Haleakala || Pan-STARRS ||  || align=right | 1.6 km || 
|-id=747 bgcolor=#E9E9E9
| 605747 ||  || — || March 22, 2015 || Haleakala || Pan-STARRS ||  || align=right | 1.1 km || 
|-id=748 bgcolor=#E9E9E9
| 605748 ||  || — || August 23, 2003 || Palomar || NEAT ||  || align=right | 2.3 km || 
|-id=749 bgcolor=#E9E9E9
| 605749 ||  || — || February 26, 2014 || Mount Lemmon || Mount Lemmon Survey ||  || align=right | 1.7 km || 
|-id=750 bgcolor=#E9E9E9
| 605750 ||  || — || February 14, 2005 || Kitt Peak || Spacewatch ||  || align=right | 1.4 km || 
|-id=751 bgcolor=#E9E9E9
| 605751 ||  || — || October 1, 2003 || Kitt Peak || Spacewatch ||  || align=right | 1.7 km || 
|-id=752 bgcolor=#E9E9E9
| 605752 ||  || — || September 19, 2003 || Kitt Peak || Spacewatch ||  || align=right | 1.4 km || 
|-id=753 bgcolor=#E9E9E9
| 605753 ||  || — || January 28, 2014 || Mount Lemmon || Mount Lemmon Survey ||  || align=right | 2.0 km || 
|-id=754 bgcolor=#E9E9E9
| 605754 ||  || — || September 13, 2007 || Kitt Peak || Spacewatch ||  || align=right | 1.6 km || 
|-id=755 bgcolor=#E9E9E9
| 605755 ||  || — || April 6, 2005 || Mount Lemmon || Mount Lemmon Survey ||  || align=right | 1.9 km || 
|-id=756 bgcolor=#E9E9E9
| 605756 ||  || — || September 13, 2007 || Mount Lemmon || Mount Lemmon Survey ||  || align=right | 1.1 km || 
|-id=757 bgcolor=#E9E9E9
| 605757 ||  || — || March 13, 2010 || Mount Lemmon || Mount Lemmon Survey ||  || align=right | 1.2 km || 
|-id=758 bgcolor=#E9E9E9
| 605758 ||  || — || August 2, 2011 || Haleakala || Pan-STARRS ||  || align=right | 2.2 km || 
|-id=759 bgcolor=#E9E9E9
| 605759 ||  || — || September 25, 2016 || Haleakala || Pan-STARRS ||  || align=right | 2.2 km || 
|-id=760 bgcolor=#fefefe
| 605760 ||  || — || August 24, 2012 || Mayhill-ISON || L. Elenin ||  || align=right data-sort-value="0.74" | 740 m || 
|-id=761 bgcolor=#d6d6d6
| 605761 ||  || — || December 23, 2012 || Haleakala || Pan-STARRS ||  || align=right | 2.1 km || 
|-id=762 bgcolor=#E9E9E9
| 605762 ||  || — || September 5, 2016 || Mount Lemmon || Mount Lemmon Survey ||  || align=right | 1.8 km || 
|-id=763 bgcolor=#E9E9E9
| 605763 ||  || — || October 26, 2012 || Mount Lemmon || Mount Lemmon Survey ||  || align=right | 1.6 km || 
|-id=764 bgcolor=#E9E9E9
| 605764 ||  || — || February 28, 2014 || Haleakala || Pan-STARRS ||  || align=right | 1.6 km || 
|-id=765 bgcolor=#E9E9E9
| 605765 ||  || — || December 19, 2007 || Mount Lemmon || Mount Lemmon Survey ||  || align=right | 1.9 km || 
|-id=766 bgcolor=#E9E9E9
| 605766 ||  || — || November 3, 1999 || Socorro || LINEAR ||  || align=right | 1.6 km || 
|-id=767 bgcolor=#E9E9E9
| 605767 ||  || — || October 8, 2016 || Haleakala || Pan-STARRS ||  || align=right | 1.9 km || 
|-id=768 bgcolor=#E9E9E9
| 605768 ||  || — || August 17, 2016 || Haleakala || Pan-STARRS ||  || align=right | 1.3 km || 
|-id=769 bgcolor=#E9E9E9
| 605769 ||  || — || September 20, 2003 || Kitt Peak || Spacewatch ||  || align=right | 1.4 km || 
|-id=770 bgcolor=#d6d6d6
| 605770 ||  || — || October 9, 2016 || Mount Lemmon || Mount Lemmon Survey ||  || align=right | 2.1 km || 
|-id=771 bgcolor=#FA8072
| 605771 ||  || — || October 9, 2016 || Kitt Peak || Spacewatch || H || align=right data-sort-value="0.37" | 370 m || 
|-id=772 bgcolor=#E9E9E9
| 605772 ||  || — || August 29, 2002 || Palomar || NEAT ||  || align=right | 1.9 km || 
|-id=773 bgcolor=#E9E9E9
| 605773 ||  || — || November 1, 2007 || Kitt Peak || Spacewatch ||  || align=right | 1.9 km || 
|-id=774 bgcolor=#E9E9E9
| 605774 ||  || — || April 25, 2015 || Haleakala || Pan-STARRS ||  || align=right | 1.6 km || 
|-id=775 bgcolor=#fefefe
| 605775 ||  || — || April 26, 2011 || Mount Lemmon || Mount Lemmon Survey ||  || align=right data-sort-value="0.85" | 850 m || 
|-id=776 bgcolor=#E9E9E9
| 605776 ||  || — || September 13, 2007 || Catalina || CSS ||  || align=right | 1.9 km || 
|-id=777 bgcolor=#E9E9E9
| 605777 ||  || — || October 9, 2002 || Kitt Peak || Spacewatch ||  || align=right | 1.8 km || 
|-id=778 bgcolor=#E9E9E9
| 605778 ||  || — || October 8, 2007 || Catalina || CSS ||  || align=right | 2.4 km || 
|-id=779 bgcolor=#d6d6d6
| 605779 ||  || — || October 21, 2011 || Kitt Peak || Spacewatch ||  || align=right | 2.0 km || 
|-id=780 bgcolor=#E9E9E9
| 605780 ||  || — || October 5, 2016 || Mount Lemmon || Mount Lemmon Survey ||  || align=right | 1.8 km || 
|-id=781 bgcolor=#d6d6d6
| 605781 ||  || — || November 18, 2011 || Mount Lemmon || Mount Lemmon Survey ||  || align=right | 2.1 km || 
|-id=782 bgcolor=#E9E9E9
| 605782 ||  || — || October 6, 2016 || Mount Lemmon || Mount Lemmon Survey ||  || align=right | 1.8 km || 
|-id=783 bgcolor=#E9E9E9
| 605783 ||  || — || October 13, 2016 || Mount Lemmon || Mount Lemmon Survey ||  || align=right | 1.0 km || 
|-id=784 bgcolor=#E9E9E9
| 605784 ||  || — || August 10, 2007 || Kitt Peak || Spacewatch ||  || align=right | 1.3 km || 
|-id=785 bgcolor=#E9E9E9
| 605785 ||  || — || October 2, 2016 || Mount Lemmon || Mount Lemmon Survey ||  || align=right | 1.4 km || 
|-id=786 bgcolor=#E9E9E9
| 605786 ||  || — || October 7, 2016 || Mount Lemmon || Mount Lemmon Survey ||  || align=right | 1.4 km || 
|-id=787 bgcolor=#d6d6d6
| 605787 ||  || — || October 8, 2016 || Haleakala || Pan-STARRS ||  || align=right | 2.1 km || 
|-id=788 bgcolor=#E9E9E9
| 605788 ||  || — || October 7, 2016 || Mount Lemmon || Mount Lemmon Survey ||  || align=right | 1.8 km || 
|-id=789 bgcolor=#E9E9E9
| 605789 ||  || — || October 12, 2016 || Haleakala || Pan-STARRS ||  || align=right | 1.5 km || 
|-id=790 bgcolor=#E9E9E9
| 605790 ||  || — || October 7, 2016 || Haleakala || Pan-STARRS ||  || align=right data-sort-value="0.72" | 720 m || 
|-id=791 bgcolor=#d6d6d6
| 605791 ||  || — || October 8, 2016 || Haleakala || Pan-STARRS ||  || align=right | 1.9 km || 
|-id=792 bgcolor=#E9E9E9
| 605792 ||  || — || February 6, 2014 || Mount Lemmon || Mount Lemmon Survey ||  || align=right data-sort-value="0.88" | 880 m || 
|-id=793 bgcolor=#E9E9E9
| 605793 ||  || — || August 24, 2011 || Haleakala || Pan-STARRS ||  || align=right | 2.0 km || 
|-id=794 bgcolor=#FA8072
| 605794 ||  || — || May 13, 2016 || Haleakala || Pan-STARRS ||  || align=right data-sort-value="0.79" | 790 m || 
|-id=795 bgcolor=#E9E9E9
| 605795 ||  || — || October 1, 2002 || Ondrejov || P. Pravec ||  || align=right | 2.6 km || 
|-id=796 bgcolor=#E9E9E9
| 605796 ||  || — || November 5, 2002 || Kitt Peak || Spacewatch ||  || align=right | 2.2 km || 
|-id=797 bgcolor=#E9E9E9
| 605797 ||  || — || January 7, 2013 || Mount Lemmon || Mount Lemmon Survey ||  || align=right | 1.7 km || 
|-id=798 bgcolor=#E9E9E9
| 605798 ||  || — || September 29, 2008 || Kitt Peak || Spacewatch ||  || align=right data-sort-value="0.90" | 900 m || 
|-id=799 bgcolor=#fefefe
| 605799 ||  || — || September 14, 2013 || Mount Lemmon || Mount Lemmon Survey ||  || align=right data-sort-value="0.54" | 540 m || 
|-id=800 bgcolor=#E9E9E9
| 605800 ||  || — || September 30, 2003 || Kitt Peak || Spacewatch ||  || align=right | 1.8 km || 
|}

605801–605900 

|-bgcolor=#E9E9E9
| 605801 ||  || — || October 4, 2016 || Mount Lemmon || Mount Lemmon Survey ||  || align=right | 1.7 km || 
|-id=802 bgcolor=#E9E9E9
| 605802 ||  || — || October 8, 2016 || Kitt Peak || Spacewatch ||  || align=right data-sort-value="0.96" | 960 m || 
|-id=803 bgcolor=#E9E9E9
| 605803 ||  || — || October 6, 2016 || Mount Lemmon || Mount Lemmon Survey ||  || align=right | 1.7 km || 
|-id=804 bgcolor=#E9E9E9
| 605804 ||  || — || February 14, 2009 || Kitt Peak || Spacewatch ||  || align=right | 2.0 km || 
|-id=805 bgcolor=#E9E9E9
| 605805 ||  || — || October 19, 2007 || Kitt Peak || Spacewatch ||  || align=right | 1.9 km || 
|-id=806 bgcolor=#fefefe
| 605806 ||  || — || November 9, 2009 || Kitt Peak || Spacewatch ||  || align=right data-sort-value="0.76" | 760 m || 
|-id=807 bgcolor=#fefefe
| 605807 ||  || — || November 1, 2006 || Kitt Peak || Spacewatch ||  || align=right data-sort-value="0.63" | 630 m || 
|-id=808 bgcolor=#d6d6d6
| 605808 ||  || — || September 3, 2010 || Mount Lemmon || Mount Lemmon Survey ||  || align=right | 2.2 km || 
|-id=809 bgcolor=#FA8072
| 605809 ||  || — || March 11, 2008 || Kitt Peak || Spacewatch || H || align=right data-sort-value="0.47" | 470 m || 
|-id=810 bgcolor=#d6d6d6
| 605810 ||  || — || July 27, 2015 || Cerro Paranal || M. Altmann, T. Prusti ||  || align=right | 2.3 km || 
|-id=811 bgcolor=#d6d6d6
| 605811 ||  || — || September 30, 1995 || Kitt Peak || Spacewatch ||  || align=right | 2.1 km || 
|-id=812 bgcolor=#d6d6d6
| 605812 ||  || — || November 17, 2011 || Mount Lemmon || Mount Lemmon Survey ||  || align=right | 2.2 km || 
|-id=813 bgcolor=#E9E9E9
| 605813 ||  || — || November 24, 2012 || Kitt Peak || Spacewatch ||  || align=right | 1.2 km || 
|-id=814 bgcolor=#fefefe
| 605814 ||  || — || September 21, 2011 || Kitt Peak || Spacewatch || H || align=right data-sort-value="0.50" | 500 m || 
|-id=815 bgcolor=#E9E9E9
| 605815 ||  || — || October 10, 2007 || Mount Lemmon || Mount Lemmon Survey ||  || align=right | 1.9 km || 
|-id=816 bgcolor=#E9E9E9
| 605816 ||  || — || December 11, 2012 || Mount Lemmon || Mount Lemmon Survey ||  || align=right | 1.7 km || 
|-id=817 bgcolor=#E9E9E9
| 605817 ||  || — || September 26, 2016 || Haleakala || Pan-STARRS ||  || align=right | 1.8 km || 
|-id=818 bgcolor=#E9E9E9
| 605818 ||  || — || September 27, 2016 || Haleakala || Pan-STARRS ||  || align=right | 1.2 km || 
|-id=819 bgcolor=#E9E9E9
| 605819 ||  || — || August 24, 2011 || Haleakala || Pan-STARRS ||  || align=right | 1.7 km || 
|-id=820 bgcolor=#E9E9E9
| 605820 ||  || — || January 10, 2014 || Mount Lemmon || Mount Lemmon Survey ||  || align=right data-sort-value="0.90" | 900 m || 
|-id=821 bgcolor=#fefefe
| 605821 ||  || — || July 12, 2005 || Mount Lemmon || Mount Lemmon Survey ||  || align=right data-sort-value="0.55" | 550 m || 
|-id=822 bgcolor=#E9E9E9
| 605822 ||  || — || December 5, 2007 || Kitt Peak || Spacewatch ||  || align=right | 1.9 km || 
|-id=823 bgcolor=#d6d6d6
| 605823 ||  || — || October 2, 2016 || Mount Lemmon || Mount Lemmon Survey ||  || align=right | 2.2 km || 
|-id=824 bgcolor=#E9E9E9
| 605824 ||  || — || November 7, 2012 || Mount Lemmon || Mount Lemmon Survey ||  || align=right | 1.0 km || 
|-id=825 bgcolor=#E9E9E9
| 605825 ||  || — || October 8, 2007 || Kitt Peak || Spacewatch ||  || align=right | 1.6 km || 
|-id=826 bgcolor=#d6d6d6
| 605826 ||  || — || October 2, 2006 || Mount Lemmon || Mount Lemmon Survey ||  || align=right | 1.7 km || 
|-id=827 bgcolor=#fefefe
| 605827 ||  || — || February 9, 2014 || Mount Lemmon || Mount Lemmon Survey ||  || align=right data-sort-value="0.52" | 520 m || 
|-id=828 bgcolor=#d6d6d6
| 605828 ||  || — || March 7, 2008 || Mount Lemmon || Mount Lemmon Survey ||  || align=right | 2.0 km || 
|-id=829 bgcolor=#E9E9E9
| 605829 ||  || — || October 2, 2016 || Mount Lemmon || Mount Lemmon Survey ||  || align=right | 1.2 km || 
|-id=830 bgcolor=#d6d6d6
| 605830 ||  || — || April 21, 2014 || Kitt Peak || Spacewatch ||  || align=right | 2.5 km || 
|-id=831 bgcolor=#E9E9E9
| 605831 ||  || — || November 9, 2004 || Mauna Kea || Mauna Kea Obs. ||  || align=right data-sort-value="0.74" | 740 m || 
|-id=832 bgcolor=#E9E9E9
| 605832 ||  || — || October 20, 2007 || Mount Lemmon || Mount Lemmon Survey ||  || align=right | 1.6 km || 
|-id=833 bgcolor=#E9E9E9
| 605833 ||  || — || February 28, 2014 || Haleakala || Pan-STARRS ||  || align=right | 1.3 km || 
|-id=834 bgcolor=#E9E9E9
| 605834 ||  || — || June 7, 2015 || Haleakala || Pan-STARRS ||  || align=right | 1.1 km || 
|-id=835 bgcolor=#E9E9E9
| 605835 ||  || — || July 28, 2003 || Palomar || NEAT ||  || align=right | 2.9 km || 
|-id=836 bgcolor=#E9E9E9
| 605836 ||  || — || October 12, 2007 || Kitt Peak || Spacewatch ||  || align=right | 1.5 km || 
|-id=837 bgcolor=#E9E9E9
| 605837 ||  || — || September 20, 2011 || Haleakala || Pan-STARRS || HOF || align=right | 1.9 km || 
|-id=838 bgcolor=#d6d6d6
| 605838 ||  || — || September 30, 2006 || Mount Lemmon || Mount Lemmon Survey ||  || align=right | 1.9 km || 
|-id=839 bgcolor=#d6d6d6
| 605839 ||  || — || October 2, 2006 || Mount Lemmon || Mount Lemmon Survey ||  || align=right | 1.6 km || 
|-id=840 bgcolor=#E9E9E9
| 605840 ||  || — || September 11, 2007 || Mount Lemmon || Mount Lemmon Survey ||  || align=right data-sort-value="0.93" | 930 m || 
|-id=841 bgcolor=#d6d6d6
| 605841 ||  || — || January 5, 2013 || Kitt Peak || Spacewatch ||  || align=right | 1.6 km || 
|-id=842 bgcolor=#d6d6d6
| 605842 ||  || — || April 1, 2014 || Kitt Peak || Spacewatch ||  || align=right | 2.0 km || 
|-id=843 bgcolor=#d6d6d6
| 605843 ||  || — || September 19, 2006 || Kitt Peak || Spacewatch ||  || align=right | 1.9 km || 
|-id=844 bgcolor=#E9E9E9
| 605844 ||  || — || October 26, 2016 || Haleakala || Pan-STARRS ||  || align=right | 1.7 km || 
|-id=845 bgcolor=#E9E9E9
| 605845 ||  || — || October 2, 2016 || Mount Lemmon || Mount Lemmon Survey ||  || align=right | 1.6 km || 
|-id=846 bgcolor=#E9E9E9
| 605846 ||  || — || November 7, 2008 || Kitt Peak || Spacewatch ||  || align=right data-sort-value="0.84" | 840 m || 
|-id=847 bgcolor=#E9E9E9
| 605847 ||  || — || May 22, 2011 || Mount Lemmon || Mount Lemmon Survey ||  || align=right data-sort-value="0.65" | 650 m || 
|-id=848 bgcolor=#d6d6d6
| 605848 ||  || — || November 16, 2011 || Mount Lemmon || Mount Lemmon Survey ||  || align=right | 2.0 km || 
|-id=849 bgcolor=#E9E9E9
| 605849 ||  || — || April 11, 2010 || Mount Lemmon || Mount Lemmon Survey ||  || align=right | 1.6 km || 
|-id=850 bgcolor=#d6d6d6
| 605850 ||  || — || February 10, 2008 || Kitt Peak || Spacewatch ||  || align=right | 1.7 km || 
|-id=851 bgcolor=#d6d6d6
| 605851 ||  || — || May 4, 2014 || Haleakala || Pan-STARRS ||  || align=right | 1.9 km || 
|-id=852 bgcolor=#fefefe
| 605852 ||  || — || October 9, 2016 || Haleakala || Pan-STARRS ||  || align=right data-sort-value="0.82" | 820 m || 
|-id=853 bgcolor=#E9E9E9
| 605853 ||  || — || June 13, 2015 || Haleakala || Pan-STARRS ||  || align=right | 1.8 km || 
|-id=854 bgcolor=#E9E9E9
| 605854 ||  || — || October 1, 2016 || Mount Lemmon || Mount Lemmon Survey ||  || align=right | 2.2 km || 
|-id=855 bgcolor=#fefefe
| 605855 ||  || — || April 27, 2008 || Mount Lemmon || Mount Lemmon Survey ||  || align=right data-sort-value="0.56" | 560 m || 
|-id=856 bgcolor=#E9E9E9
| 605856 ||  || — || April 2, 2014 || Mount Lemmon || Mount Lemmon Survey ||  || align=right | 1.9 km || 
|-id=857 bgcolor=#E9E9E9
| 605857 ||  || — || September 30, 2003 || Kitt Peak || Spacewatch ||  || align=right | 1.3 km || 
|-id=858 bgcolor=#d6d6d6
| 605858 ||  || — || October 20, 2006 || Kitt Peak || Spacewatch || KOR || align=right | 1.2 km || 
|-id=859 bgcolor=#E9E9E9
| 605859 ||  || — || October 9, 2016 || Mount Lemmon || Mount Lemmon Survey ||  || align=right | 1.5 km || 
|-id=860 bgcolor=#d6d6d6
| 605860 ||  || — || August 22, 2004 || Kitt Peak || Spacewatch ||  || align=right | 2.5 km || 
|-id=861 bgcolor=#E9E9E9
| 605861 ||  || — || April 25, 2015 || Haleakala || Pan-STARRS ||  || align=right data-sort-value="0.96" | 960 m || 
|-id=862 bgcolor=#E9E9E9
| 605862 ||  || — || July 22, 2007 || Siding Spring || SSS ||  || align=right | 1.4 km || 
|-id=863 bgcolor=#d6d6d6
| 605863 ||  || — || April 2, 2009 || Kitt Peak || Spacewatch ||  || align=right | 1.8 km || 
|-id=864 bgcolor=#E9E9E9
| 605864 ||  || — || April 14, 2010 || Kitt Peak || Spacewatch ||  || align=right | 1.5 km || 
|-id=865 bgcolor=#d6d6d6
| 605865 ||  || — || October 24, 2016 || Mount Lemmon || Mount Lemmon Survey ||  || align=right | 2.0 km || 
|-id=866 bgcolor=#d6d6d6
| 605866 ||  || — || October 28, 2016 || Haleakala || Pan-STARRS ||  || align=right | 2.0 km || 
|-id=867 bgcolor=#fefefe
| 605867 ||  || — || January 9, 2007 || Mount Lemmon || Mount Lemmon Survey || H || align=right data-sort-value="0.57" | 570 m || 
|-id=868 bgcolor=#E9E9E9
| 605868 ||  || — || December 13, 2012 || Mount Lemmon || Mount Lemmon Survey ||  || align=right data-sort-value="0.88" | 880 m || 
|-id=869 bgcolor=#E9E9E9
| 605869 ||  || — || April 21, 2009 || Mount Lemmon || Mount Lemmon Survey ||  || align=right | 2.4 km || 
|-id=870 bgcolor=#E9E9E9
| 605870 ||  || — || April 24, 2006 || Kitt Peak || Spacewatch ||  || align=right | 1.7 km || 
|-id=871 bgcolor=#E9E9E9
| 605871 ||  || — || September 7, 2011 || Kitt Peak || Spacewatch ||  || align=right | 1.8 km || 
|-id=872 bgcolor=#d6d6d6
| 605872 ||  || — || April 30, 2014 || Haleakala || Pan-STARRS ||  || align=right | 2.0 km || 
|-id=873 bgcolor=#d6d6d6
| 605873 ||  || — || June 24, 2015 || Haleakala || Pan-STARRS ||  || align=right | 2.6 km || 
|-id=874 bgcolor=#E9E9E9
| 605874 ||  || — || December 23, 2012 || Haleakala || Pan-STARRS ||  || align=right | 2.0 km || 
|-id=875 bgcolor=#d6d6d6
| 605875 ||  || — || July 4, 2014 || Haleakala || Pan-STARRS ||  || align=right | 2.7 km || 
|-id=876 bgcolor=#d6d6d6
| 605876 ||  || — || November 10, 2016 || Haleakala || Pan-STARRS ||  || align=right | 3.6 km || 
|-id=877 bgcolor=#E9E9E9
| 605877 ||  || — || February 13, 2013 || ESA OGS || ESA OGS ||  || align=right | 1.0 km || 
|-id=878 bgcolor=#d6d6d6
| 605878 ||  || — || June 29, 2015 || Haleakala || Pan-STARRS ||  || align=right | 2.1 km || 
|-id=879 bgcolor=#fefefe
| 605879 ||  || — || November 10, 2016 || Haleakala || Pan-STARRS ||  || align=right data-sort-value="0.70" | 700 m || 
|-id=880 bgcolor=#fefefe
| 605880 ||  || — || November 4, 2016 || Haleakala || Pan-STARRS ||  || align=right data-sort-value="0.73" | 730 m || 
|-id=881 bgcolor=#d6d6d6
| 605881 ||  || — || November 9, 2016 || Mount Lemmon || Mount Lemmon Survey ||  || align=right | 2.3 km || 
|-id=882 bgcolor=#d6d6d6
| 605882 ||  || — || November 6, 2016 || Mount Lemmon || Mount Lemmon Survey ||  || align=right | 2.3 km || 
|-id=883 bgcolor=#fefefe
| 605883 ||  || — || September 14, 2005 || Kitt Peak || Spacewatch ||  || align=right data-sort-value="0.56" | 560 m || 
|-id=884 bgcolor=#fefefe
| 605884 ||  || — || March 15, 2008 || Kitt Peak || Spacewatch ||  || align=right data-sort-value="0.79" | 790 m || 
|-id=885 bgcolor=#d6d6d6
| 605885 ||  || — || January 14, 2012 || Haleakala || Pan-STARRS ||  || align=right | 3.3 km || 
|-id=886 bgcolor=#d6d6d6
| 605886 ||  || — || October 26, 2016 || Mount Lemmon || Mount Lemmon Survey ||  || align=right | 1.8 km || 
|-id=887 bgcolor=#d6d6d6
| 605887 ||  || — || December 1, 2011 || Haleakala || Pan-STARRS ||  || align=right | 2.5 km || 
|-id=888 bgcolor=#E9E9E9
| 605888 ||  || — || November 19, 2012 || Kitt Peak || Spacewatch ||  || align=right data-sort-value="0.81" | 810 m || 
|-id=889 bgcolor=#E9E9E9
| 605889 ||  || — || March 21, 2015 || Haleakala || Pan-STARRS ||  || align=right | 1.8 km || 
|-id=890 bgcolor=#d6d6d6
| 605890 ||  || — || July 26, 2015 || Haleakala || Pan-STARRS ||  || align=right | 2.4 km || 
|-id=891 bgcolor=#d6d6d6
| 605891 ||  || — || August 10, 2015 || Haleakala || Pan-STARRS ||  || align=right | 2.5 km || 
|-id=892 bgcolor=#d6d6d6
| 605892 ||  || — || September 16, 2006 || Palomar || NEAT ||  || align=right | 2.3 km || 
|-id=893 bgcolor=#d6d6d6
| 605893 ||  || — || January 17, 2007 || Mount Lemmon || Mount Lemmon Survey ||  || align=right | 2.1 km || 
|-id=894 bgcolor=#E9E9E9
| 605894 ||  || — || January 16, 2005 || Kitt Peak || Spacewatch ||  || align=right | 2.1 km || 
|-id=895 bgcolor=#d6d6d6
| 605895 ||  || — || September 5, 2010 || Bergisch Gladbach || W. Bickel ||  || align=right | 2.7 km || 
|-id=896 bgcolor=#d6d6d6
| 605896 ||  || — || April 7, 2013 || Haleakala || Pan-STARRS ||  || align=right | 2.9 km || 
|-id=897 bgcolor=#d6d6d6
| 605897 ||  || — || November 10, 2016 || Mount Lemmon || Mount Lemmon Survey ||  || align=right | 2.3 km || 
|-id=898 bgcolor=#E9E9E9
| 605898 ||  || — || December 22, 2012 || Haleakala || Pan-STARRS ||  || align=right | 1.6 km || 
|-id=899 bgcolor=#d6d6d6
| 605899 ||  || — || August 9, 2015 || Haleakala || Pan-STARRS ||  || align=right | 2.2 km || 
|-id=900 bgcolor=#fefefe
| 605900 ||  || — || April 4, 2015 || Haleakala || Pan-STARRS || H || align=right data-sort-value="0.57" | 570 m || 
|}

605901–606000 

|-bgcolor=#d6d6d6
| 605901 ||  || — || October 24, 2011 || Mount Lemmon || Mount Lemmon Survey ||  || align=right | 3.3 km || 
|-id=902 bgcolor=#E9E9E9
| 605902 ||  || — || October 9, 2002 || Palomar || NEAT ||  || align=right | 2.0 km || 
|-id=903 bgcolor=#fefefe
| 605903 ||  || — || November 26, 2003 || Kitt Peak || Spacewatch || H || align=right data-sort-value="0.61" | 610 m || 
|-id=904 bgcolor=#d6d6d6
| 605904 ||  || — || October 19, 2006 || Kitt Peak || Spacewatch ||  || align=right | 2.4 km || 
|-id=905 bgcolor=#E9E9E9
| 605905 ||  || — || April 30, 2014 || Haleakala || Pan-STARRS ||  || align=right | 1.9 km || 
|-id=906 bgcolor=#E9E9E9
| 605906 ||  || — || August 31, 2011 || Piszkesteto || K. Sárneczky ||  || align=right | 1.8 km || 
|-id=907 bgcolor=#d6d6d6
| 605907 ||  || — || November 23, 2016 || Mount Lemmon || Mount Lemmon Survey ||  || align=right | 2.1 km || 
|-id=908 bgcolor=#E9E9E9
| 605908 ||  || — || November 30, 2016 || Mount Lemmon || Mount Lemmon Survey ||  || align=right | 1.5 km || 
|-id=909 bgcolor=#E9E9E9
| 605909 ||  || — || November 18, 2007 || Mount Lemmon || Mount Lemmon Survey ||  || align=right | 2.0 km || 
|-id=910 bgcolor=#d6d6d6
| 605910 ||  || — || November 18, 2011 || Mount Lemmon || Mount Lemmon Survey ||  || align=right | 2.5 km || 
|-id=911 bgcolor=#FFC2E0
| 605911 Cecily ||  ||  || December 3, 2016 || Big Water || D. Rankin || AMO || align=right data-sort-value="0.50" | 500 m || 
|-id=912 bgcolor=#E9E9E9
| 605912 ||  || — || January 1, 2009 || Mount Lemmon || Mount Lemmon Survey ||  || align=right | 1.5 km || 
|-id=913 bgcolor=#E9E9E9
| 605913 ||  || — || July 9, 2015 || Haleakala || Pan-STARRS ||  || align=right | 1.3 km || 
|-id=914 bgcolor=#d6d6d6
| 605914 ||  || — || October 28, 2016 || Haleakala || Pan-STARRS ||  || align=right | 2.3 km || 
|-id=915 bgcolor=#fefefe
| 605915 ||  || — || August 5, 2008 || Siding Spring || SSS ||  || align=right data-sort-value="0.82" | 820 m || 
|-id=916 bgcolor=#E9E9E9
| 605916 ||  || — || January 18, 2013 || Kitt Peak || Spacewatch ||  || align=right | 1.8 km || 
|-id=917 bgcolor=#d6d6d6
| 605917 ||  || — || December 4, 2016 || Mount Lemmon || Mount Lemmon Survey ||  || align=right | 2.3 km || 
|-id=918 bgcolor=#d6d6d6
| 605918 ||  || — || November 19, 2016 || Mount Lemmon || Mount Lemmon Survey ||  || align=right | 2.3 km || 
|-id=919 bgcolor=#E9E9E9
| 605919 ||  || — || December 19, 2003 || Kitt Peak || Spacewatch ||  || align=right | 2.1 km || 
|-id=920 bgcolor=#d6d6d6
| 605920 ||  || — || March 13, 2012 || Mount Lemmon || Mount Lemmon Survey ||  || align=right | 2.3 km || 
|-id=921 bgcolor=#d6d6d6
| 605921 ||  || — || March 14, 2007 || Mount Lemmon || Mount Lemmon Survey ||  || align=right | 2.7 km || 
|-id=922 bgcolor=#fefefe
| 605922 ||  || — || September 24, 2009 || Catalina || CSS ||  || align=right data-sort-value="0.59" | 590 m || 
|-id=923 bgcolor=#d6d6d6
| 605923 ||  || — || October 29, 2005 || Mount Lemmon || Mount Lemmon Survey ||  || align=right | 2.8 km || 
|-id=924 bgcolor=#E9E9E9
| 605924 ||  || — || August 29, 2011 || Siding Spring || SSS ||  || align=right | 2.3 km || 
|-id=925 bgcolor=#E9E9E9
| 605925 ||  || — || November 1, 2007 || Catalina || CSS ||  || align=right | 1.9 km || 
|-id=926 bgcolor=#E9E9E9
| 605926 ||  || — || October 5, 2002 || Palomar || NEAT ||  || align=right | 2.5 km || 
|-id=927 bgcolor=#d6d6d6
| 605927 ||  || — || September 4, 2010 || Mount Lemmon || Mount Lemmon Survey ||  || align=right | 2.5 km || 
|-id=928 bgcolor=#fefefe
| 605928 ||  || — || December 5, 2016 || Mount Lemmon || Mount Lemmon Survey ||  || align=right data-sort-value="0.59" | 590 m || 
|-id=929 bgcolor=#d6d6d6
| 605929 ||  || — || December 5, 2016 || Mount Lemmon || Mount Lemmon Survey ||  || align=right | 2.0 km || 
|-id=930 bgcolor=#E9E9E9
| 605930 ||  || — || December 4, 2016 || Mount Lemmon || Mount Lemmon Survey ||  || align=right | 1.3 km || 
|-id=931 bgcolor=#E9E9E9
| 605931 ||  || — || November 4, 2007 || Kitt Peak || Spacewatch ||  || align=right | 1.4 km || 
|-id=932 bgcolor=#E9E9E9
| 605932 ||  || — || December 4, 2016 || Mount Lemmon || Mount Lemmon Survey ||  || align=right | 1.0 km || 
|-id=933 bgcolor=#E9E9E9
| 605933 ||  || — || December 4, 2016 || Mount Lemmon || Mount Lemmon Survey ||  || align=right data-sort-value="0.78" | 780 m || 
|-id=934 bgcolor=#fefefe
| 605934 ||  || — || January 19, 2012 || Haleakala || Pan-STARRS || H || align=right data-sort-value="0.47" | 470 m || 
|-id=935 bgcolor=#fefefe
| 605935 ||  || — || February 3, 2012 || Haleakala || Pan-STARRS || H || align=right data-sort-value="0.49" | 490 m || 
|-id=936 bgcolor=#d6d6d6
| 605936 ||  || — || December 8, 2010 || Kitt Peak || Spacewatch ||  || align=right | 2.2 km || 
|-id=937 bgcolor=#d6d6d6
| 605937 ||  || — || December 22, 2016 || Haleakala || Pan-STARRS ||  || align=right | 2.6 km || 
|-id=938 bgcolor=#d6d6d6
| 605938 ||  || — || December 24, 2016 || Mount Lemmon || Mount Lemmon Survey ||  || align=right | 2.7 km || 
|-id=939 bgcolor=#d6d6d6
| 605939 ||  || — || November 30, 2010 || Mount Lemmon || Mount Lemmon Survey ||  || align=right | 2.6 km || 
|-id=940 bgcolor=#d6d6d6
| 605940 ||  || — || September 26, 2003 || Apache Point || SDSS Collaboration ||  || align=right | 3.1 km || 
|-id=941 bgcolor=#d6d6d6
| 605941 ||  || — || January 19, 2012 || Haleakala || Pan-STARRS ||  || align=right | 2.3 km || 
|-id=942 bgcolor=#fefefe
| 605942 ||  || — || December 22, 2008 || Kitt Peak || Spacewatch || H || align=right data-sort-value="0.67" | 670 m || 
|-id=943 bgcolor=#d6d6d6
| 605943 ||  || — || July 28, 2003 || Palomar || NEAT ||  || align=right | 3.8 km || 
|-id=944 bgcolor=#E9E9E9
| 605944 ||  || — || January 11, 2008 || Kitt Peak || Spacewatch ||  || align=right | 2.1 km || 
|-id=945 bgcolor=#d6d6d6
| 605945 ||  || — || November 18, 2015 || Haleakala || Pan-STARRS ||  || align=right | 2.3 km || 
|-id=946 bgcolor=#d6d6d6
| 605946 ||  || — || January 4, 2017 || Haleakala || Pan-STARRS ||  || align=right | 2.4 km || 
|-id=947 bgcolor=#C2FFFF
| 605947 ||  || — || January 4, 2017 || Haleakala || Pan-STARRS || L5 || align=right | 6.0 km || 
|-id=948 bgcolor=#fefefe
| 605948 ||  || — || January 6, 2013 || Kitt Peak || Spacewatch ||  || align=right data-sort-value="0.58" | 580 m || 
|-id=949 bgcolor=#E9E9E9
| 605949 ||  || — || January 7, 2017 || Mount Lemmon || Mount Lemmon Survey ||  || align=right | 1.3 km || 
|-id=950 bgcolor=#d6d6d6
| 605950 ||  || — || February 28, 2012 || Haleakala || Pan-STARRS ||  || align=right | 3.5 km || 
|-id=951 bgcolor=#d6d6d6
| 605951 ||  || — || February 1, 2006 || Kitt Peak || Spacewatch ||  || align=right | 3.1 km || 
|-id=952 bgcolor=#E9E9E9
| 605952 ||  || — || April 2, 2014 || Mount Lemmon || Mount Lemmon Survey ||  || align=right | 1.2 km || 
|-id=953 bgcolor=#d6d6d6
| 605953 ||  || — || July 25, 2014 || Haleakala || Pan-STARRS ||  || align=right | 2.6 km || 
|-id=954 bgcolor=#d6d6d6
| 605954 ||  || — || June 28, 2014 || Haleakala || Pan-STARRS ||  || align=right | 3.2 km || 
|-id=955 bgcolor=#E9E9E9
| 605955 ||  || — || February 14, 2013 || Mount Lemmon || Mount Lemmon Survey ||  || align=right data-sort-value="0.79" | 790 m || 
|-id=956 bgcolor=#d6d6d6
| 605956 ||  || — || January 13, 2011 || Mount Lemmon || Mount Lemmon Survey ||  || align=right | 2.1 km || 
|-id=957 bgcolor=#fefefe
| 605957 ||  || — || November 6, 2016 || Mount Lemmon || Mount Lemmon Survey || H || align=right data-sort-value="0.77" | 770 m || 
|-id=958 bgcolor=#d6d6d6
| 605958 ||  || — || March 1, 2012 || Catalina || CSS ||  || align=right | 3.9 km || 
|-id=959 bgcolor=#d6d6d6
| 605959 ||  || — || April 5, 2003 || Kitt Peak || Spacewatch ||  || align=right | 1.9 km || 
|-id=960 bgcolor=#fefefe
| 605960 ||  || — || December 6, 2016 || Mount Lemmon || Mount Lemmon Survey || H || align=right data-sort-value="0.63" | 630 m || 
|-id=961 bgcolor=#fefefe
| 605961 ||  || — || June 27, 2015 || Haleakala || Pan-STARRS || H || align=right data-sort-value="0.57" | 570 m || 
|-id=962 bgcolor=#d6d6d6
| 605962 ||  || — || June 30, 2008 || Kitt Peak || Spacewatch ||  || align=right | 4.9 km || 
|-id=963 bgcolor=#d6d6d6
| 605963 ||  || — || November 15, 2010 || Catalina || CSS ||  || align=right | 2.5 km || 
|-id=964 bgcolor=#fefefe
| 605964 ||  || — || January 20, 2009 || Catalina || CSS || H || align=right data-sort-value="0.67" | 670 m || 
|-id=965 bgcolor=#d6d6d6
| 605965 ||  || — || December 2, 2010 || Mount Lemmon || Mount Lemmon Survey ||  || align=right | 2.2 km || 
|-id=966 bgcolor=#d6d6d6
| 605966 ||  || — || August 27, 2009 || Kitt Peak || Spacewatch ||  || align=right | 1.9 km || 
|-id=967 bgcolor=#d6d6d6
| 605967 ||  || — || July 28, 2009 || Kitt Peak || Spacewatch ||  || align=right | 2.4 km || 
|-id=968 bgcolor=#E9E9E9
| 605968 ||  || — || July 27, 2014 || Haleakala || Pan-STARRS ||  || align=right | 1.1 km || 
|-id=969 bgcolor=#d6d6d6
| 605969 ||  || — || September 4, 2014 || Haleakala || Pan-STARRS ||  || align=right | 3.7 km || 
|-id=970 bgcolor=#d6d6d6
| 605970 ||  || — || September 17, 2003 || Kitt Peak || Spacewatch ||  || align=right | 3.7 km || 
|-id=971 bgcolor=#d6d6d6
| 605971 ||  || — || December 30, 2005 || Kitt Peak || Spacewatch ||  || align=right | 2.7 km || 
|-id=972 bgcolor=#fefefe
| 605972 ||  || — || November 27, 2013 || Haleakala || Pan-STARRS || H || align=right data-sort-value="0.48" | 480 m || 
|-id=973 bgcolor=#E9E9E9
| 605973 ||  || — || January 3, 2012 || Kitt Peak || Spacewatch ||  || align=right | 1.9 km || 
|-id=974 bgcolor=#d6d6d6
| 605974 ||  || — || February 2, 2006 || Mount Lemmon || Mount Lemmon Survey ||  || align=right | 2.4 km || 
|-id=975 bgcolor=#d6d6d6
| 605975 ||  || — || February 13, 2012 || Haleakala || Pan-STARRS ||  || align=right | 2.6 km || 
|-id=976 bgcolor=#d6d6d6
| 605976 ||  || — || November 1, 2015 || Mount Lemmon || Mount Lemmon Survey ||  || align=right | 2.1 km || 
|-id=977 bgcolor=#d6d6d6
| 605977 ||  || — || June 25, 2014 || Mount Lemmon || Mount Lemmon Survey ||  || align=right | 3.4 km || 
|-id=978 bgcolor=#d6d6d6
| 605978 ||  || — || April 24, 2001 || Kitt Peak || Spacewatch ||  || align=right | 3.5 km || 
|-id=979 bgcolor=#d6d6d6
| 605979 ||  || — || November 5, 2010 || Mount Lemmon || Mount Lemmon Survey ||  || align=right | 3.1 km || 
|-id=980 bgcolor=#d6d6d6
| 605980 ||  || — || October 29, 2010 || Mount Lemmon || Mount Lemmon Survey ||  || align=right | 1.7 km || 
|-id=981 bgcolor=#d6d6d6
| 605981 ||  || — || August 27, 2014 || Haleakala || Pan-STARRS || 7:4 || align=right | 3.2 km || 
|-id=982 bgcolor=#d6d6d6
| 605982 ||  || — || March 29, 2012 || Mount Lemmon || Mount Lemmon Survey ||  || align=right | 2.3 km || 
|-id=983 bgcolor=#d6d6d6
| 605983 ||  || — || February 25, 2011 || Mount Lemmon || Mount Lemmon Survey || 7:4 || align=right | 3.1 km || 
|-id=984 bgcolor=#E9E9E9
| 605984 ||  || — || September 8, 2015 || Haleakala || Pan-STARRS ||  || align=right | 1.2 km || 
|-id=985 bgcolor=#d6d6d6
| 605985 ||  || — || February 27, 2012 || Haleakala || Pan-STARRS ||  || align=right | 2.6 km || 
|-id=986 bgcolor=#d6d6d6
| 605986 ||  || — || January 26, 2011 || Mount Lemmon || Mount Lemmon Survey ||  || align=right | 2.3 km || 
|-id=987 bgcolor=#d6d6d6
| 605987 ||  || — || March 21, 2012 || Mount Lemmon || Mount Lemmon Survey ||  || align=right | 2.3 km || 
|-id=988 bgcolor=#fefefe
| 605988 ||  || — || January 29, 2017 || Mount Lemmon || Mount Lemmon Survey || H || align=right data-sort-value="0.44" | 440 m || 
|-id=989 bgcolor=#fefefe
| 605989 ||  || — || January 28, 2017 || Haleakala || Pan-STARRS || H || align=right data-sort-value="0.40" | 400 m || 
|-id=990 bgcolor=#d6d6d6
| 605990 ||  || — || January 27, 2017 || Haleakala || Pan-STARRS ||  || align=right | 2.2 km || 
|-id=991 bgcolor=#d6d6d6
| 605991 ||  || — || May 19, 2010 || Mount Lemmon || Mount Lemmon Survey || 3:2 || align=right | 3.9 km || 
|-id=992 bgcolor=#d6d6d6
| 605992 ||  || — || December 14, 2015 || Haleakala || Pan-STARRS ||  || align=right | 2.0 km || 
|-id=993 bgcolor=#d6d6d6
| 605993 ||  || — || January 30, 2017 || Haleakala || Pan-STARRS ||  || align=right | 2.3 km || 
|-id=994 bgcolor=#C2FFFF
| 605994 ||  || — || January 28, 2017 || Haleakala || Pan-STARRS || L5 || align=right | 7.6 km || 
|-id=995 bgcolor=#d6d6d6
| 605995 ||  || — || July 23, 2015 || Haleakala || Pan-STARRS ||  || align=right | 2.5 km || 
|-id=996 bgcolor=#d6d6d6
| 605996 ||  || — || June 27, 2014 || Haleakala || Pan-STARRS ||  || align=right | 3.3 km || 
|-id=997 bgcolor=#d6d6d6
| 605997 ||  || — || November 5, 2010 || Mount Lemmon || Mount Lemmon Survey ||  || align=right | 3.3 km || 
|-id=998 bgcolor=#d6d6d6
| 605998 ||  || — || January 26, 2012 || Haleakala || Pan-STARRS ||  || align=right | 2.1 km || 
|-id=999 bgcolor=#fefefe
| 605999 ||  || — || February 15, 2010 || Kitt Peak || Spacewatch ||  || align=right data-sort-value="0.49" | 490 m || 
|-id=000 bgcolor=#d6d6d6
| 606000 ||  || — || March 25, 2012 || Mount Lemmon || Mount Lemmon Survey ||  || align=right | 2.3 km || 
|}

References

External links 
 Discovery Circumstances: Numbered Minor Planets (605001)–(610000) (IAU Minor Planet Center)

0605